= List of fully civilian crewed suborbital spaceflights =

Following the definition that a civilian is someone who is not part of their country's armed forces (not in active duty; former service or reservist status is not considered being part of armed forces), these are suborbital space flights (spaceflight according to US 50 mile space boundary definition) with a fully civilian crew:

== List ==
No.	Mission	Ship	Date	Crew	Result.	Ref.
1	X-15 Flight 77	X-15	17.01.1963	(United States) Joseph Walker	Success	
2	X-15 Flight 90	X-15 #3	19.07.1963	(United States) Joseph Walker	Success	
3	X-15 Flight 91	X-15	22.08.1963	(United States) Joseph Walker	Success	
4	X-15 Flight 150	X-15	22.09.1965	(United States) John B. McKay	Success	
5	X-15 Flight 174	X-15	01.11.1966	(United States) William H. Dana	Success	
6	X-15 Flight 197	X-15	21.08.1968	(United States) William H. Dana	Success	
7	SpaceShipOne flight 15P	SpaceShipOne	21.06.2004	(South Africa) Mike Melvill	Success	
8	SpaceShipOne flight 16P	SpaceShipOne	29.09.2004	(South Africa) Mike Melvill	Success	
9	SpaceShipOne flight 17P	SpaceShipOne	04.10.2004	(United States) Brian Binnie	Success	
10	VSS Unity VP-03	VSS Unity	13.12.2018	(United States) Mark P. Stucky, (United States) Frederick Sturckow	Success	
11	VSS Unity VF-01	VSS Unity	22.02.2019	(Scotland) David Mackay, (United States) Michael Masucci, (United States) Beth Moses	Success	
12	Virgin Galactic Unity 21	VSS Unity	22.05.2021	(United States) Frederick Sturckow, (Scotland) David Mackay	Success	
13	Virgin Galactic Unity 22	VSS Unity	11.06.2021	(Scotland) David Mackay, (United States) Michael Masucci, (United States) Sirisha Bandla, (United Kingdom) Colin Bennett, (United States) Beth Moses, (United Kingdom) Richard Branson	Success	
14	Blue Origin NS-16	RSS First Step	20.07.2021	(United States) Jeff Bezos, (United States) Mark Bezos, (United States) Wally Funk, (Netherlands) Oliver Daemen	Success	
15	Blue Origin NS-18	RSS First Step	13.10.2021	(United States) Audrey Powers, (Australia) Chris Boshuizen, (United States) Glen de Vries, (Canada) William Shatner	Success	
16	Blue Origin NS-19	RSS First Step	11.12.2021	(United States) Michael Strahan, (United States) Laura Shepard-Churchley, (United States) Dylan Taylor, (United States) Lane Bess, (United States) Cameron Bess, (United States) Evan L. Dick	Success	
17	Blue Origin NS-20	RSS First Step	30.03.2022	(United States) Marty Allen, (United States) Sharon Hagle, (United States) Marc Hagle, (United States) Jim Kitchen, (United States) George Nield, (United States) Gary Lai	Success	
18	Blue Origin NS-21	RSS First Step	04.06.2022	(United States) Evan Dick, (United States) Katya Echazarreta, (United Kingdom) Hamish Harding, (Brazil) Victor Correa Hespanha, (United States) Jaison Robinson, (United States) Victor Vescovo	Success	
19	Blue Origin NS-22	RSS First Step	04.08.2022	(United States) Coby Cotton, (Portugal) Mário Ferreira, (United Kingdom) Vanessa O'Brien, (United States) Clint Kelly III, (Egypt) Sara Sabry, (United States) Steve Young	Success	
20	Unity 25	VSS Unity	25.05.2023	(United States) Michael Masucci, (United States) Frederick Sturckow, (United States) Beth Moses, (United States) Luke Mays, (United States) Jamila Gilbert, (United States) Christopher Huie	Success	
21	Galactic 02	VSS Unity	10.08.2023	(United States) Frederick Sturckow, (United States) Kelly Latimer, (United States) Beth Moses, (United Kingdom) Jon Goodwin, (Antigua and Barbuda) Keisha Schahaff, (Antigua and Barbuda) Anastatia Mayers	Success	
21	Galactic 03	VSS Unity	08.09.2023	(United States) Michael Masucci, (United States) Beth Moses, (United Kingdom) Adrian Reynard, (Italy) Nicole Pecile, (United States) Ken Baxter, (United Kingdom) / (South Africa) Timothy Nash	Success	
21	Galactic 04	VSS Unity	06.10.2023	(United States) Frederick Sturckow, (United States) Kelly Latimer, (United States) Beth Moses, (United Kingdom) Trevor Beattie, (Pakistan) Namira Salim, (United States) Ron Rosano	Success	
21	Galactic 05	VSS Unity	02.11.2023	(United States) Michael Masucci, (United States) Kelly Latimer, (United Kingdom) Colin Bennett, (United States) Alan Stern, (United States) Kellie Gerardi, (Italy) Ketty Maisonrouge	Success	
21	Galactic 06	VSS Unity	26.01.2024	(United States) Frederick Sturckow, (Italy) Nicola Pecile, (Ukraine) / (United States) Lina Borozdina, (United States) Robie Vaughn, (Austria) Franz Haider, (United States) Neil Kornswiet	Success	
22	Blue Origin NS-25	RSS First Step	19.05.2024	(United States) Mason Angel, (France) Sylvain Chiron, (United States) Ed Dwight, (United States) Carol Schaller, (United States) Kenneth Hess, (India) Thotakura Gopichand	Success	
23	Galactic 07	VSS Unity	08.06.2024	(United States) Jameel Janjua, (Italy) Nicola Pecile, (United States) Irving Pergament, (United States) Andy Sadhwani, (Turkey) Tuva Cihangir Atasever, (Italy) Giorgio Manenti	Success	
24	Blue Origin NS-26	RSS First Step	29.08.2024	(United Kingdom) / (Singapore) Nicolina Elrick, (United States) Karsen Kitchen, (United States) Rob Ferl, (Ukraine) Eugene Grin, (Iran) / (United States) Eiman Jahangir, (United States) / (Israel) Ephraim Rabin	Success	
25	Blue Origin NS-28	RSS First Step	22.11.2024	(United States) Emily Calandrelli, (United States) Sharon Hagle, (United States) Marc Hagle, (United States) Austin Litteral, (United States) James (J.D.) Russell, (Canada) Henry Wolfond	Success	
26	Blue Origin NS-30	RSS First Step	25.02.2025	(United States) Lane Bess, (Spain) Jesús Calleja, (United States) Tushar Shah, (United States) Dr. Richard Scott, (Australia) Elaine Chia Hyde, (Australia) Russell Wilson	Success	
26	Blue Origin NS-31	RSS Karman Line	14.04.2025	(United States) / (The Bahamas) Aisha Bowe, (United States) Amanda Nguyen, (United States) Gayle King, (United States) Katy Perry, (United States) Kerianne Flynn, (United States) Lauren Sánchez	Success	
26	Blue Origin NS-32	RSS First Step	31.05.2025	(New Zealand) Mark Rocket, (Panama) Jaime Alemán, (Puerto Rico) Aymette (Amy) Medina Jorge, (United States) Dr. Gretchen Green, (Canada) Jesse Williams, (United States) Paul Jeris	Success	
26	Blue Origin NS-33	RSS First Step	29.06.2025	(United States) Allie Kuehner, (United States) Carl Kuehner, (United States) Leland Larson, (United States) Freddie Rescigno, Jr., (Nigeria) Owolabi Salis, (United States) James (Jim) Sitkin	Success	
26	Blue Origin NS-34	RSS First Step	03.08.2025	(United States) James (J.D.) Russell, (Puerto Rico) Deborah Martorell, (Saint Kitts and Nevis) H.E. Justin Sun, (Turkey) Gökhan Erdem, (United Kingdom) Lionel Pitchford, (United States) Arvinder (Arvi) Singh Bahal	Success	
27	Blue Origin NS-36	RSS First Step	08.10.2025	(United States) Clint Kelly III, (United States) Aaron Newman, (United States) Jeff Elgin, (Ukraine) Vitalii Ostrovsky, (Kazakhstan) Danna Karagussova, (United States) William H. Lewis	Success	

Color:

Flights with space tourists.

== See also ==
- List of fully civilian crewed orbital spaceflights
- Timeline of private spaceflight

== Bibliography ==
- Evans, Michele (2020). The X-15 Rocket Plane (PDF). p. 59. Archived (PDF) from the original on 2020-08-04.
