= VSS Unity =

American commercial sub-orbitable space ship

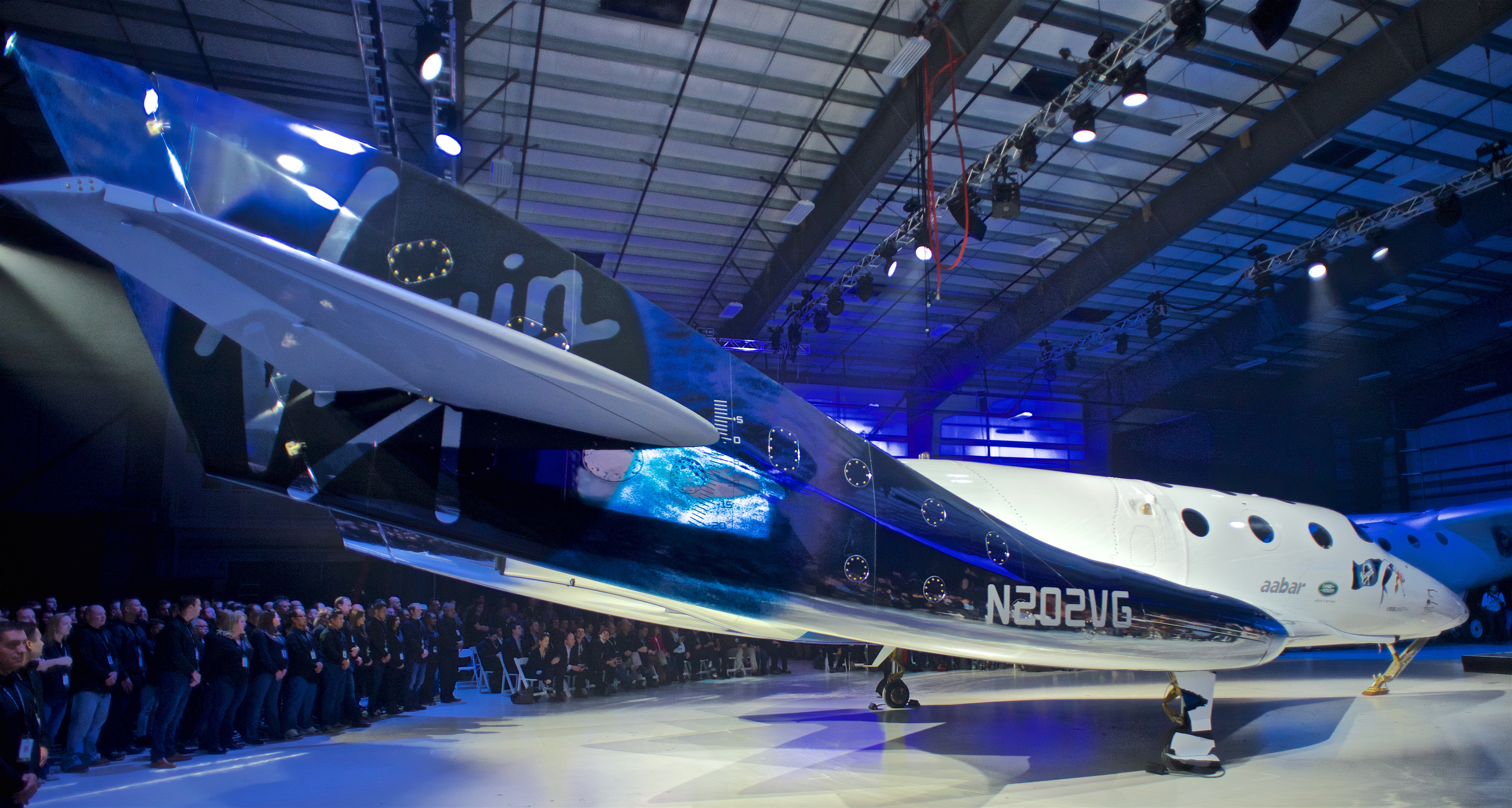
- Virgin Galactic SpaceShipTwo Unity rollout, 19 February 2016, FAITH hangar, Mojave, California

General information
- Type: Scaled Composites Model 339 SpaceShipTwo
- Manufacturer: The Spaceship Company
- Owners: Virgin Galactic
- Construction number: 2
- Registration: N202VG

History
- First flight: 8 September 2016 (captive carry flight); 3 December 2016 (glide flight); 5 April 2018 (powered flight); 13 December 2018 (spaceflight dependent upon definition)
- In service: 2016–2024, 2026–
- Fate: Retired 8 June 2024, return to flight 27 May 2026

VSS Unity (Virgin Space Ship Unity, registration: N202VG), previously referred to as VSS Voyager, is a SpaceShipTwo-class suborbital rocket-powered crewed spaceplane. It was the second SpaceShipTwo to be built and was part of the Virgin Galactic fleet. It first reached space as defined by the United States (above 50 miles or 80.5 km) on 13 December 2018, on the VP-03 mission.

Unity was able to reach space as defined by the U.S. Air Force, NASA, and the FAA, by going over 50 miles (80.5 km) above sea level. However, it was unable to go above the Kármán line, the FAI's defined space boundary of 100 km (62.1 miles).

VSS Unity was rolled out on 19 February 2016 and completed ground-based system integration testing in September 2016, prior to its first flight on 8 September 2016.

Unity was initially retired on 8 June 2024 after its final powered flight took place on that date, as Virgin Galactic shifted its focus to the next generation Delta-class vehicles. On 27 May 2026 Unity returned to flight, conducting a training glide flight to train pilots for Delta-class vehicles.

== Overview ==
VSS Unity, the second SpaceShipTwo suborbital spaceplane for Virgin Galactic, was the first SpaceShipTwo built by The Spaceship Company. The ship's name was announced on 19 February 2016. Prior to the naming announcement, the craft was referred to as SpaceShipTwo, Serial Number Two. There was speculation in 2004 that Serial Number Two would be named VSS Voyager, an unofficial name that was repeatedly used in media coverage. The name Unity was chosen by British physicist Stephen Hawking. Hawking's eye was also used as the model for the eye logo on the side of Unity.

== History ==
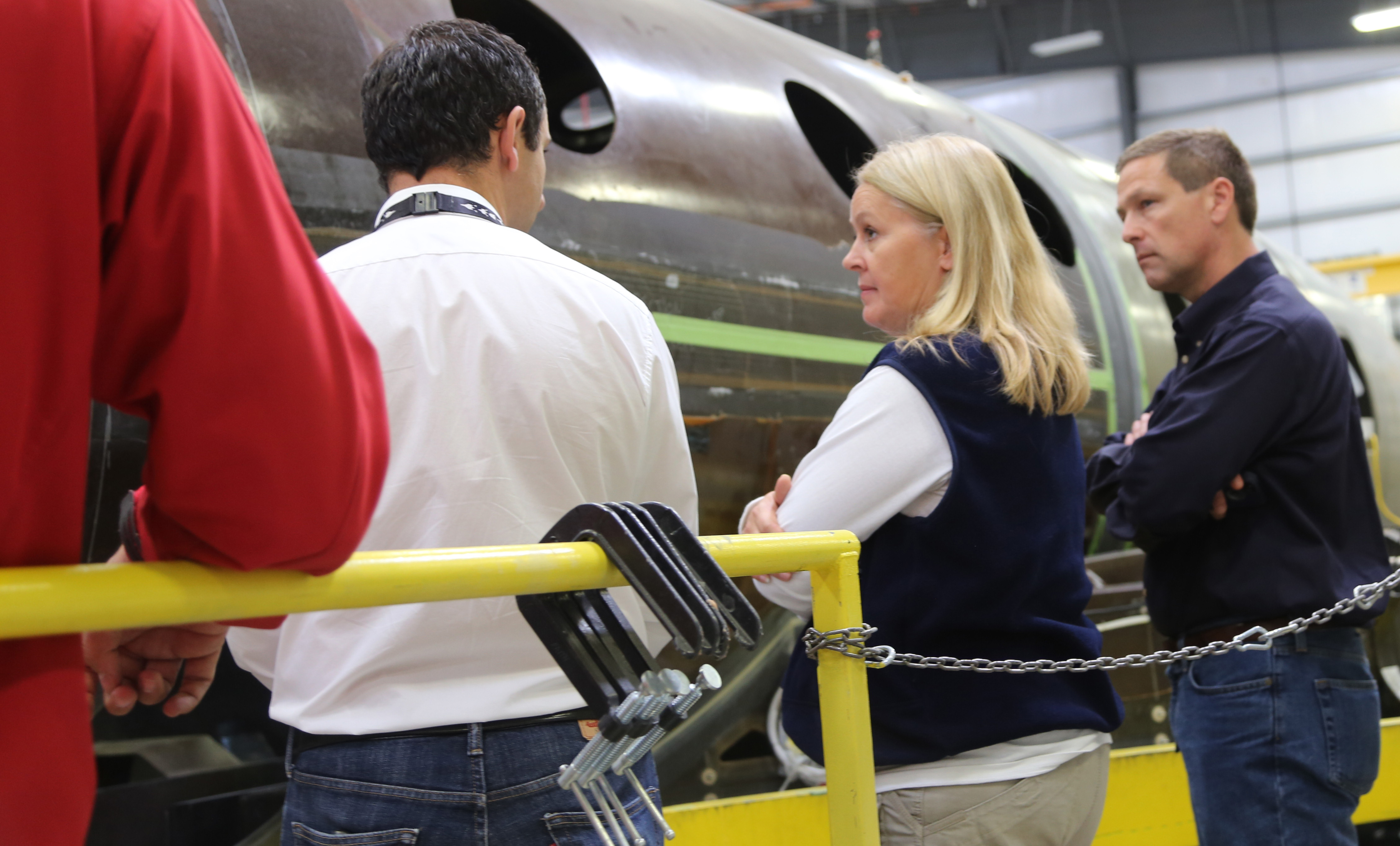
VSS Unity under construction

The manufacture of Unity began in 2012. The spacecraft's registration, N202VG, was filed in September 2014. As of early November 2014, the build of Unity was about 90 percent structurally complete, and 65 percent complete overall. As of April 2015, ground tests of Unity were projected to be able to begin as early as late 2015, after being projected as early as mid-2015 as of November 2014. On 21 May 2015, Unity reached the milestone of bearing the weight of the airframe on its own wheels. The spaceship was unveiled on 19 February 2016, as Virgin Galactic founder Sir Richard Branson had projected in November 2015; ground and flight testing commenced thereafter.

VSS Unity was the second SpaceShipTwo to be completed; the first, VSS Enterprise, was destroyed in a crash in late October 2014.

After rollout and unveiling, a phase of testing called "Integrated Vehicle Ground Testing" began on VSS Unity in February 2016.

=== Test flight program ===
VSS Unity underwent a test regimen similar to VSS Enterprise and then embarked on testing beyond what Enterprise experienced. The test flights were expected to be fewer, as Enterprise had already tested the design's responses under numerous conditions. For each flight test, the White Knight Two aircraft carried Unity to altitude. Testing began with captive carry flights, in which Unity was not released from its carrier aircraft. Testing then progressed to free-flight glide testing, and continued with powered test flights.

On 8 September 2016, Virgin Galactic commenced flight testing of Unity with a captive-carry flight. On 1 November 2016, Virgin Galactic conducted another captive-carry flight of Unity but cancelled the glide portion of the flight because of wind speed. On 3 November and 30 November, additional captive-carry flights took place.

In July 2017, Richard Branson suggested that the craft was to begin powered tests at three-week intervals. In September 2017, CEO George Whitesides suggested that engine testing was complete, and that only a "small number of glide flights" remained before VSS Unity would begin powered test flights. The first powered flight test took place on 5 April 2018 when a 30-second rocket firing accelerated Unity to a speed of Mach 1.87 and an altitude of 84,271 ft (25,686 m). The first powered test flight of Unity exceeded the altitude of all powered test flights of its predecessor, Enterprise.

VSS Unity VP-03, the first suborbital spaceflight of VSS Unity was successfully completed on 13 December 2018, surpassing the 50 miles (80 km) altitude considered the boundary of outer space by NASA and the United States Air Force.

Following its February 2019 flight to space, VSS Unity began to undergo modifications including installation of the commercial cabin, and changes to cockpit displays. Upon completion of these modifications, VSS Unity along with its carrier craft, VMS Eve, were moved to Spaceport America in New Mexico in February 2020. After completing two additional glide tests in New Mexico in May and June 2020, VSS Unity underwent final modifications to the commercial cabin and in July 2020, Virgin Galactic first publicly showed the interior of the spacecraft.

Unity then continued the test flight program in the years 2020–2023. A notable flight occurred in 2021 when Virgin Galactic founder Richard Branson flew aboard Unity to space. The final test flight (defined as final flight with only Virgin Galactic personnel on board) was Virgin Galactic Unity 25 mission on 25 May 2023. The first operational flight of Unity (defined as the first flight flying passengers that were not Virgin Galactic employees) was Galactic 01 on 29 June 2023.

Powered flights of VSS Unity ended mid-2024 to focus the effort on the next generation Delta-class vehicles, then expected for 2025–26.

On 27 May 2026, VSS Unity returned to flight, conducting the first in a series of planned glide flights to train pilots for future Delta-class vehicles.

=== List of spaceflights by VSS Unity ===
VSS Unity flights into space (above 50 miles)
Flight	Date	Outcome	Top speed	Altitude	Crew
VSS Unity VP-03	13 December 2018	Success	Mach 2.9	82.72 km (51.40 mi)	Mark P. Stucky and Frederick W. Sturckow
VSS Unity VF-01	22 February 2019	Success	Mach 3.04	89.9 km (55.9 mi)	Dave Mackay, Michael Masucci, and Beth Moses (passenger)
VSS Unity VF-02	12 December 2020, 16:15 UTC (aborted)	Aborted prior to ignition	N/A	N/A	Dave Mackay and Frederick W. Sturckow. Attempted spaceflight
VSS Unity 21	22 May 2021, 15:26 UTC	Success	Mach 3	89.2 km (55.4 mi)	Dave Mackay and Frederick W. Sturckow
VSS Unity 22	11 July 2021, 15:04 UTC	Success (Note: The flight was initially claimed to be successful but it was later revealed Unity briefly stepped outside the airspace that had been reserved for it and the FAA were not informed as required. The FAA grounded Virgin Galactic's space planes before allowing a resumption of flights after some changes to procedures including reserving a larger volume of airspace.)	Mach 3.2	86 km (53 mi)	David Mackay, Michael Masucci, Sirisha Bandla, Colin Bennett, Beth Moses and Richard Branson
VSS Unity Unity 25	25 May 2023, 16:23 UTC	Success	Mach 2.94	87.2 km (54.2 mi)	Michael Masucci, Frederick W. Sturckow, Beth Moses, Luke Mays, Jamila Gilbert, Christopher Huie
Galactic 01	29 June 2023, 15:28 UTC	Success	Mach 2.88	85.1 km (52.9 mi)	Michael Masucci, Nicola Pecile, Walter Villadei, Angelo Landolfi, Pantaleone Carlucci and Colin Bennett
Galactic 02	10 August 2023, 15:17 UTC	Success	Mach 3.00	88.5 km (55.0 mi)	CJ Sturckow, Kelly Latimer, Beth Moses, Jon Goodwin, Keisha Schahaff, Anastatia Mayers
Galactic 03	8 September 2023, 15:22 UTC	Success	Mach 2.95	88.6 km (55.1 mi)	Michael Masucci, Nicola Pecile, Beth Moses, Timothy Nash, Ken Baxter, Adrian Reynard
Galactic 04	6 October 2023, 16:10 UTC	Success	Mach 2.95	87.4 km (54.3 mi)	Kelly Latimer, CJ Sturckow, Beth Moses, Ron Rosano, Trevor Beattie, Namira Salim
Galactic 05	2 November 2023, 15:44 UTC	Success	Mach 2.96	87.2 km (54.2 mi)	Michael Masucci, Kelly Latimer, Colin Bennett, Alan Stern, Kellie Gerardi, Ketty Maisonrouge
Galactic 06	26 January 2024, 17:42 UTC	Success	Mach 2.98	88.8 km (55.2 mi)	CJ Sturckow, Nicola Pecile, Lina Borozdina, Robie Vaughn, Franz Haider, Neil Kornswiet
Galactic 07	8 June 2024	Success	Mach 2.96	87.5 km (54.4 mi)	Nicola Pecile, Jameel Janjua, Tuva Cihangir Atasever, Giorgio Manenti, Irving (Yitzhak) Pergament, Andy Sadhwani; Final Unity powered flight

=== Full list of flights ===
===== Legend =====
Code	Detail
GFxx	Glide Flight
CCxx	Captive Carry Flight
CFxx	Cold Flow Flight
PFxx	Powered Flight
Fxx	Feathering deployed

===== Flights =====
Flight designation	Date	Duration	Maximum altitude	Top speed	Pilot / co-pilot / passengers	Notes
01 / CC01	8 September 2016		15.2 km (50,000 ft)		Stucky / Mackay	
02 / CC02	1 November 2016					Strong winds, no release during flight intended as GF01
03 / CC03	3 November 2016					Strong winds, no release during second attempt at GF01
04 / CC04	30 November 2016					Test of minor modifications
05 / GF01	3 December 2016	10 minutes	16.8 km (55,000 ft)	Mach 0.6	Stucky / Mackay	First Glide Flight
06 / GF02	22 December 2016				Stucky / Mackay	
07 / GF03	24 February 2017				Sturckow / Mackay	3rd Glide Flight
08 / GF04	1 May 2017				Stucky / Masucci	F01
09 / CF01	1 June 2017				Mackay / Sturckow	
10 / GF06	4 August 2017				Mackay / Sturckow	First flight with major propulsion components aboard.
11 / GF07	11 January 2018			Mach 0.9	Stucky / Masucci	
12 / PF01	5 April 2018		25.7 km (84,300 ft)	Mach 1.87	Stucky / Mackay	F02
13 / PF02	29 May 2018		34.9 km (114,501 ft)	Mach 1.9	Mackay / Stucky	Test of changed center of gravity as passenger seats carried for first time. F03
14 / PF03	26 July 2018		52.1 km (170,800 ft)	Mach 2.47	Mackay / Masucci	Reached Mesosphere for first time.
15 / VP-03	13 December 2018		82.7 km (271,330 ft)	Mach 2.9	Stucky / Sturckow	Reached outer space for first time according to the US definition of the space border.
16 / VF-01	22 February 2019		89.9 km (295,007 ft)	Mach 3.04	Mackay / Masucci / Moses	Carried third crew member (1 in the passenger cabin) for the first time
17 / GF08	1 May 2020		15.24 km (50,000 ft)	Mach 0.7	Mackay / Sturckow	First flight from New Mexico
18 / GF09	25 June 2020		15.54 km (51,000 ft)	Mach 0.85	Stucky / Masucci	
19	12 December 2020				Mackay / Sturckow	First attempted crewed spaceflight from New Mexico, aborted due to computer malfunction, engine ignited and automatically turned off.
21 / VF-03	22 May 2021		89.23 km (55.45 mi)		Mackay / Sturckow	First crewed spaceflight (above 50 miles) from New Mexico
22	11 July 2021		86.1 km (53.5 mi)		Mackay / Masucci / Sirisha Bandla, Colin Bennett, Beth Moses, Richard Branson	First fully crewed (Note: The SpaceShipTwo vehicles (like VSS Unity) were originally designed for 8 people, 6 passengers and 2 pilots, so whether this flight was fully-crewed is debatable. But it is true that at the time of this flight, only 6 seats (4 passengers, 2 pilots) were installed in VSS Unity, so in this sense this flight was fully-crewed. Also, no SpaceShipTwo vehicle, VSS Unity in particular, ever had more than 6 seats installed and never flew with more than 6 people (2 pilots, 4 passengers) onboard, so in this sense this flight was also fully-crewed.) flight included Richard Branson.
24 / GF10	26 April 2023	9 minutes	13.5 km (47,000 ft)		Sturckow / Pecile	
25	25 May 2023	14 minutes	87.2 km (54.2 mi)	Mach 2.94	Masucci / Sturckow / Moses / Mays / Gilbert / Huie	
Galactic 01	29 June 2023	13:50 minutes	85.1 km (52.9 mi)	Mach 2.88	Masucci / Pecile / Villadei / Carlucci / Pandolfi / Bennett	First VSS Unity commercial service flight, carrying members of the Italian Air Force.
Galactic 02	10 August 2023	15:38 minutes	88.5 km (55.0 mi)	Mach 3.00	Sturckow / Latimer / Moses / Goodwin / Schahaff / Mayers	First VSS Unity flight carrying a private astronaut.
Galactic 03	8 September 2023	12:37 minutes	88.6 km (55.1 mi)	Mach 2.95	Masucci / Pecile / Moses / Baxter / Reynard / Nash	
Galactic 04	6 October 2023	14:23 minutes	87.4 km (54.3 mi)	Mach 2.95	Latimer / Sturckow / Moses / Rosano / Beattie / Salim	
Galactic 05	2 November 2023	14:20 minutes	87.2 km (54.2 mi)	Mach 2.96	Masucci / Latimer / Bennett / Stern / Gerardi / Maisonrouge	
Galactic 06	26 January 2024		88.8 km (55.2 mi)	Mach 2.98	Sturckow / Pecile / Borozdina / Vaughn / Haider / Kornswiet	
Galactic 07	8 June 2024		87.5 km (54.4 mi)	Mach 2.96	Pecile / Janjua / Atasever/ Manenti /Pergament / Sadhwani	Final powered flight
33 / GF11	27 May 2026				Masucci / Alix	Return to flight, training glide flight
34 / GF12	16 September 2026				Sturckow / Edgell	Training glide flight
35 / GF13	7 October 2026				Janjua / Pecile	Training glide flight

== See also ==
- Space tourism
