= Galactic 03 =

2023 private crewed suborbital spaceflight

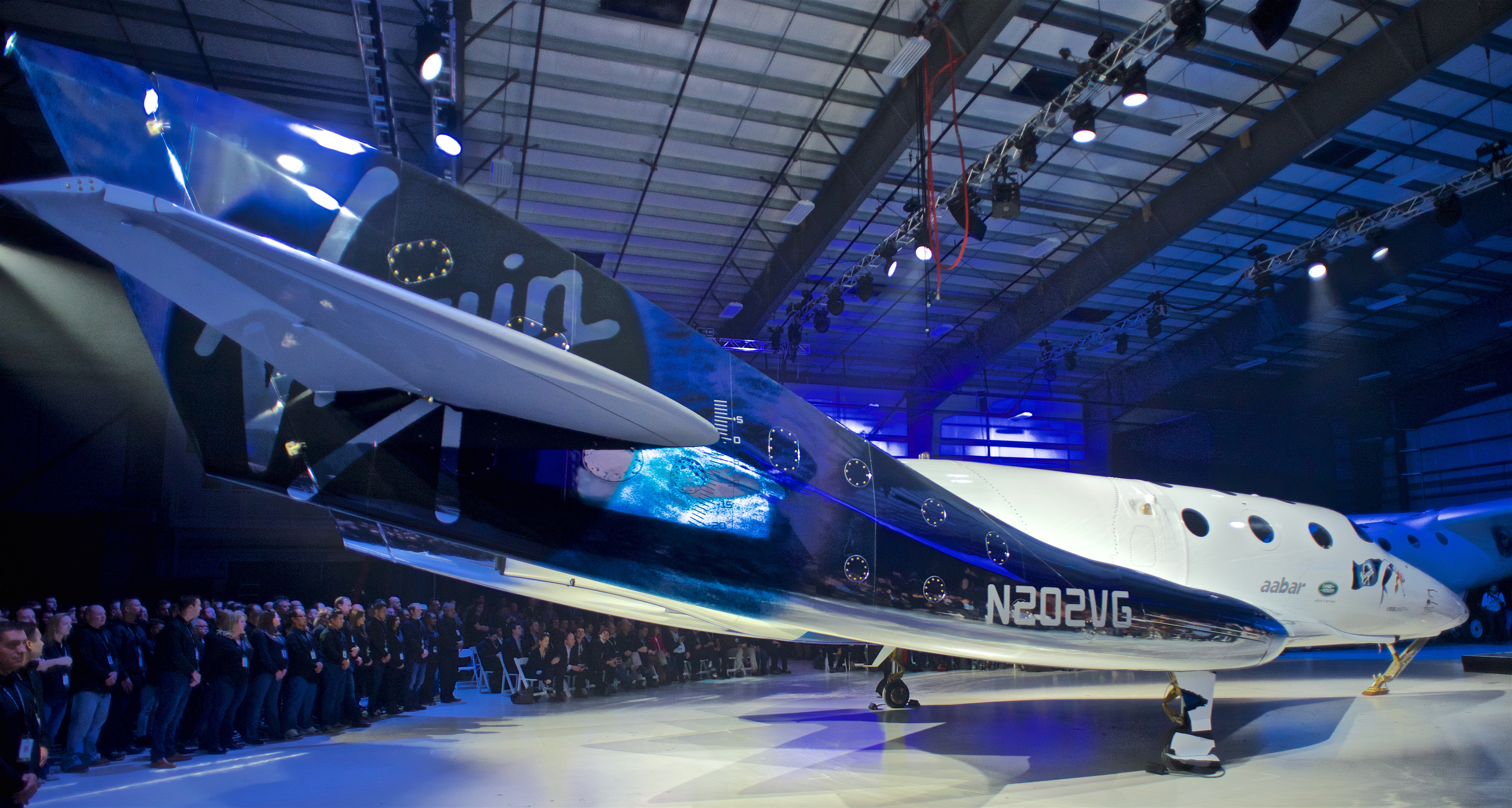
- Virgin Galactic SpaceShipTwo Unity
- Mission type: Crewed sub-orbital spaceflight
- Operator: Virgin Galactic
- Mission duration: 12 min and 37 second
- Apogee: 88.56 km (55.03 mi)

Spacecraft properties
- Spacecraft: VSS Unity
- Spacecraft type: SpaceShipTwo
- Manufacturer: The Spaceship Company

Crew
- Crew size: 6
- Members: Nicola Pecile; Michael Masucci; Beth Moses; Ken Baxter; Timothy Nash; Adrian Reynard

Start of mission
- Launch date: 8 September 2023, 14:34 UTC
- Launch site: Spaceport America Runway 34
- Deployed from: VMS Eve

End of mission
- Landing date: 8 September 2023, 15:36 UTC
- Landing site: Spaceport America Runway 34
- Galactic 03 mission patch VSS Unity spaceflights

Galactic 03 (G03) was a crewed sub-orbital spaceflight of the SpaceShipTwo-class VSS Unity, launched on 8 September 2023. It was the third commercial spaceflight and eighth overall spaceflight for American aerospace company Virgin Galactic.

== Crew ==
The crew of Galactic 03 included three private passengers and three Virgin Galactic employees.

Position	Crew
Commander	(Italy) Nicola Pecile; Second spaceflight
Pilot	(United States) Michael Masucci; Fifth spaceflight
Astronaut instructor	(United States) Beth Moses; Fifth spaceflight
Tourist	(United States) Ken Baxter; Only spaceflight
Tourist	(South Africa) Timothy Nash; Only spaceflight
Tourist	(United Kingdom) Adrian Reynard; Only spaceflight

== See also ==
- List of spaceflight launches in July–December 2023
