= Jameel Janjua =

Canadian military fighter pilot

Jameel Janjua OMM CD FRCGS
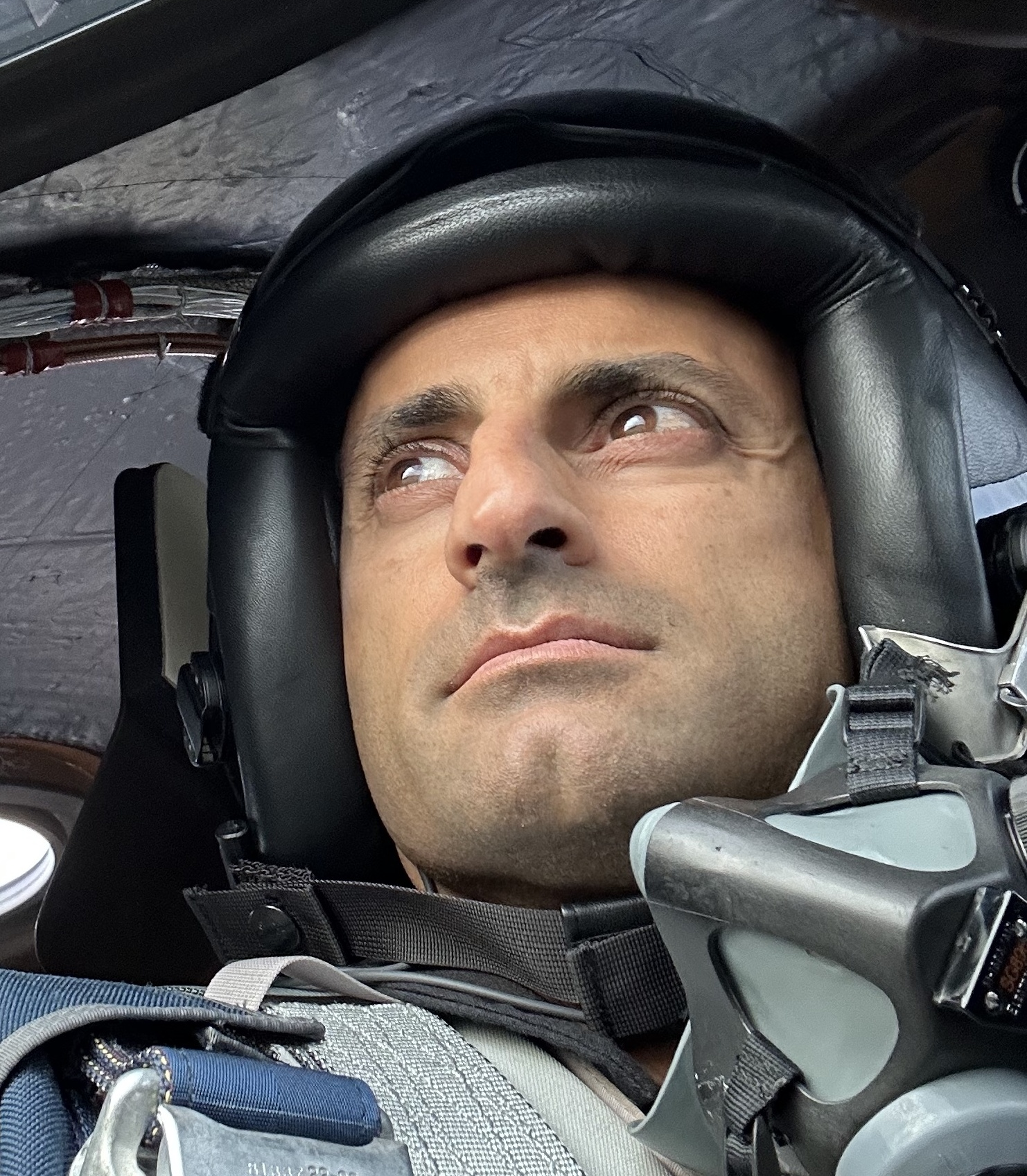
- Janjua during preflight at Spaceport America, 2024
- Born: Jameel Janjua; October 18, 1978 (age 47); Calgary, Alberta, Canada
- Education: Royal Military College of Canada (BEng); Massachusetts Institute of Technology (SM); United States Air Force Test Pilot School (MSc); Wharton School of the University of Pennsylvania (MBA)
- Space career

Commercial astronaut
- Selection: Virgin Galactic pilot selection (2020)
- Missions: Galactic 07 (VSS Unity, 2024)
- Military career
- Allegiance: Canada / USA
- Branch: Royal Canadian Air Force
- Rank: Major
- Website: www.jameeljanjua.com

Jameel Janjua OMM CD FRCGS is a fighter pilot, test pilot and astronaut. He currently serves as an experimental test pilot and commercial spaceship pilot at Virgin Galactic.

== Early life and education ==
Janjua was born in Calgary, Alberta. Prior to the partition of India, his grandparents moved to Tanzania, and his parents later emigrated to Canada. He attended the Royal Military College of Canada, where he earned a bachelor's degree in Chemical and Materials Engineering and was awarded the Governor General’s Medal as the institution’s top graduate. He subsequently received a postgraduate scholarship from the Natural Sciences and Engineering Research Council of Canada (NSERC) and completed a Master of Science degree in Aeronautics and Astronautics at the Massachusetts Institute of Technology (MIT).

In 2013–2014, he graduated from the United States Air Force Test Pilot School with a Master of Science in flight test engineering. Jameel would go on to earn a Master of Business Administration from the Wharton School of the University of Pennsylvania in 2025, where he was named a Palmer Scholar.

== Military, Test Pilot, and Astronaut Career ==
=== Royal Canadian Air Force ===
After completing his education, Janjua trained as a fighter pilot in Moose Jaw, Saskatchewan, and Cold Lake, Alberta. He completed the CF-18 Hornet conversion course, earning the Colonel Ned Henderson and Captain Tristan de Konick Memorial Trophies. He also completed the Fighter Weapons Instructor Course and served as a standards, weapons, and tactics officer in the Royal Canadian Air Force at 425 Tactical Fighter Squadron, where he flew missions for Operation Noble Eagle, defending North America from strategic and asymmetric threats. Between 2009 and 2012, he was selected as an exchange officer with the Royal Air Force, flying the Tornado GR4. He participated in operational deployments to Afghanistan and Libya in support of NATO operations.

=== Canadian Space Agency Selection Process ===
In 2009, Janjua was a finalist in the Canadian Space Agency's astronaut recruitment campaign. He was one of the last four candidates selected from a pool of 5,351 applicants.

=== Test Pilot ===
Jameel Janjua received the Liethen-Tittle Award as the top graduate of the USAF Test Pilot School in 2014, an honor previously awarded to Canadians including Chris Hadfield and Joshua Kutryk.

Following his graduation from USAF Test Pilot School, Janjua served as a developmental test pilot at the 416th Flight Test Squadron, Edwards Air Force Base, flying aircraft including the F-16 Viper and the F-15SA Advanced Eagle. He was part of the team recognized with the Collier Trophy in 2018 for its work on the Automatic Ground Collision Avoidance System (AGCAS).

Jameel Janjua has accumulated more than 5,500 total hours in over 65 types of aircraft. These include front-line fighters like the CF-18 Hornet, the Tornado GR4, the F-16 Viper, and the F-15SA Advanced Eagle, as well as one-of-a-kind experimental aircraft and spacecraft such as VMS Eve and VSS Unity, respectively.

== Astronaut Career and Space Flight ==
Janjua is currently employed by the spaceflight company Virgin Galactic. Virgin Galactic operates suborbital spaceflights using a winged spaceplane launched from a carrier aircraft, VMS Eve. On June 8, 2024, he piloted, with Commander Nicola Pecile, a VSS Unity flight to the edge of space, reaching an altitude of 287,011 feet (approximately 54.4 miles) and a speed of Mach 2.96, becoming the first Canadian to pilot a commercial spaceflight.
