= RocketMotorTwo =

Family of hybrid rocket engines

- Country of origin: United States
- Designer: Sierra Nevada Corporation
- Manufacturer: Virgin Galactic
- Predecessor: RocketMotorOne
- Status: Active

Hybrid engine
- Propellant: Nitrous oxide / Hydroxyl-terminated polybutadiene

Performance
- Thrust: 310kN
- Specific impulse: 250 s (2.5 km/s)
- Burn time: 60 seconds

Used in
- SpaceShipTwo

RocketMotorTwo (RM2) is a family of hybrid rocket engines developed for the Scaled Composites SpaceShipTwo suborbital spaceplane.

The first-generation engine was developed by Sierra Nevada Corporation (SNC), from the late 2000s to May 2014. It was first ignited in flight during a SpaceShipTwo test launch in April 2013. This engine design was subsequently flown in only two additional flight tests during 2013 and January 2014. SNC was a subcontractor to Scaled Composites through May 2014 when their involvement in the program ended after Virgin Galactic elected to replace SNC's version of RocketMotorTwo powered by HTPB rubber fuel, with its own internally developed hybrid motor for SpaceShipTwo.

The second-generation RocketMotorTwo engine is a variant of the earlier SNC basic design. It experimented with using a polyamide plastic fuel and nitrous oxide oxidizer in 2014, but switched back to using its original hydroxyl-terminated polybutadiene (HTPB) fuel and liquid nitrous oxide oxidizer in 2015. The second-generation engine is now made in-house by Virgin Galactic rather than by SNC.

== Description ==
RocketMotorTwo is a hybrid rocket engine utilizing solid hydroxyl-terminated polybutadiene (HTPB) fuel and liquid nitrous oxide oxidizer – sometimes referred to as an N_{2}O/HTPB motor – providing 70,000 pounds-force (310 kN) of thrust. The design makes use of lessons learned during the development of the SpaceShipOne hybrid rocket motor.

== Background ==
As of March 2013, Sierra Nevada had performed over 300 hybrid rocket test firings. The company also developed the rocket engine for the first private spacecraft to reach space, SpaceShipOne, which won the Ansari X-Prize in 2004. Sierra Nevada is also developing a similar hybrid engine, the Dream Chaser rocket engine.

== History ==
=== Related test program accident ===
On 26 July 2007, during the early vehicle subsystem testing phase, an explosion occurred during a propellant flow test by Scaled Composites at the Mojave Air and Space Port. The test included filling the oxidizer tank with 4,500 kg (9,900 lb) of nitrous oxide, followed by a 15-second cold flow injector test. The test did not ignite the engine and no solid rocket fuel was involved. Three Scaled employees were killed and three injured, two critically and one seriously, by flying shrapnel when the nitrous oxide oxidizer spontaneously ignited and exploded (dissociation into N2 and O components, releasing energy).

=== First-generation engine ===
==== Hot-fire ground tests ====
Scaled Composites performed a series of subscale rocket hot-firings between June 2005 and April 2009, before choosing a full-scale rocket motor design. News reports in early 2009 reported that the hot fire tests had been "completed" and that Spacedev (later acquired by Sierra Nevada Corporation) had been contracted by Scaled Composites to assist Scaled in developing SS2.

By December 2011, 21 full-scale hot-fire ground tests had been carried out on RocketMotorTwo. On 20 June 2012, the first hot-fire test under the control of SpaceShipTwo's proprietary Rocket Motor Controller (RMC) was successfully conducted.

==== Extended delays in flight testing ====
Despite statements in early 2009 that flight testing of RocketMotorTwo was planned for later in 2009, no flight tests took place in 2009, 2010 or 2011, and only glide flight tests—with the engine installed in SS2—occurred in 2012.

In July 2012, Virgin Galactic, the owner of VSS Enterprise – the first SpaceShipTwo spaceplane built – announced that RocketMotorTwo was fully qualified for powered flight, and that the ground test program was substantially complete. SpaceShipTwo conducted its first gliding test flight with the engine fully installed in December 2012. Additional ground rocket tests continued into March 2013 as the company prepared for powered test flights.

VSS Enterprise conducted its first powered flight on 29 April 2013, marking the first flight test of RocketMotorTwo. The test was a 16-second burn as planned, and was ignited at an altitude of 47,000 feet (14,000 m), shortly after Enterprise was released from its WhiteKnightTwo carrier aircraft and the pilots cross-checked data and verified stable control. The RM2 control system opened the main oxidizer valve and fired the igniters inside the fuel case. The burn was completed at an altitude of 55,000 feet (17,000 m), by which point Enterprise was supersonic, achieving Mach 1.2 (1,300 km/h; 790 mph). SNC stated after the test that "The rocket motor ignition went as planned, with the expected burn duration, [and] good engine performance."

==== 2014 change of engine ====
In May 2014, Virgin Galactic announced a change to the hybrid engine to be used in SpaceShipTwo, and took the development effort in-house, terminating the contract with Sierra Nevada and halting all development on the first-generation rocket engine.

=== Second-generation engine ===
The engineering and development work of the second-generation engine was done in-house, by Virgin Galactic. The work began on the new formulation for the hybrid engine in 2013, and by May 2014—when SNC's involvement with SS2 propulsion using the first-generation rocket motor was ended—the new engine formulation had already completed full-duration burns of over 60 seconds in ground tests on an engine test stand.

==== New fuel formulation ====
Rather than use rubber-based HTPB in the solid portion of the hybrid rocket motor—which had experienced serious engine stability issues on firings longer than approximately 20 seconds with the first-generation engine—the Virgin Galactic-developed SS2 hybrid rocket engine would now use thermoplastic polyamide (i.e., nylon) as the solid fuel component of the propellant. The plastic fuel was projected to have better performance (by several unspecified measures) and was expected to allow SpaceShipTwo to make flights to a higher altitude.

==== Related airframe and subsystem modifications to support the new engine ====
The second-generation engine design also required the modification to the SS2 airframe to fit additional tanks in the wings of SpaceShipTwo—one holding methane and the other containing helium—in order to ensure a proper burn of the new engine.

==== Ground test regime ====
Even though Virgin Galactic has run a number of ground tests on the new engine by May 2014, it was stated then that four additional ground tests of the polyamide-fueled engine were anticipated before the SpaceShipTwo flight tests could resume with the new-fuel rocket motor.

==== PF04 flight test malfunction ====
On 31 October 2014, the new polyamide engine fuel formulation was used in flight for the first time in the powered test flight no. 4 (PF04) of SpaceShipTwo. At 10:12 am PDT, VSS Enterprise suffered a malfunction, and subsequently broke up in mid-flight. The inflight mishap resulted in the death of one test pilot and a "serious shoulder injury" to the other test pilot, and a total loss of the vehicle.

The accident investigation revealed that the "ship’s fuel tanks and its engine were recovered intact, indicating there was no explosion ... no signs of burn-through, no signs of being breached". While the US government National Transportation Safety Board (NTSB), which is leading the investigation, has released only "statements of fact", space journalist Irene Klotz has stated more explicitly that "[i]t wasn’t SpaceShipTwo’s hybrid rocket motor – which was flying ... with a new type of fuel – that caused the fatal crash." The NTSB final report attributed that the cause was 1) pilot error and 2) inadequate cockpit and procedure design that tended to make a certain high-stress situation more consequential for the pilot than it perhaps should have been.

== Production ==
The HTPB hybrid rocket motor and its oxidizer valve system were produced in SNC's manufacturing facility in Poway, California in conjunction with Scaled Composites. In 2013, the Poway facility was reported to be "currently producing motors for both SpaceShipTwo and SNC’s own Dream Chaser orbital crew vehicle". SNC closed the Poway facility in late 2014.

The polyamide hybrid rocket motor is a modified version of the polybutadiene version, with different oxidizer valve arrangement. Most of the engine remains the same, but for changing the fuel cartridge from rubber to plastic fuel.

== See also ==
- Dream Chaser rocket engine
