= Galactic 01 =

2023 American crewed sub-orbital spaceflight

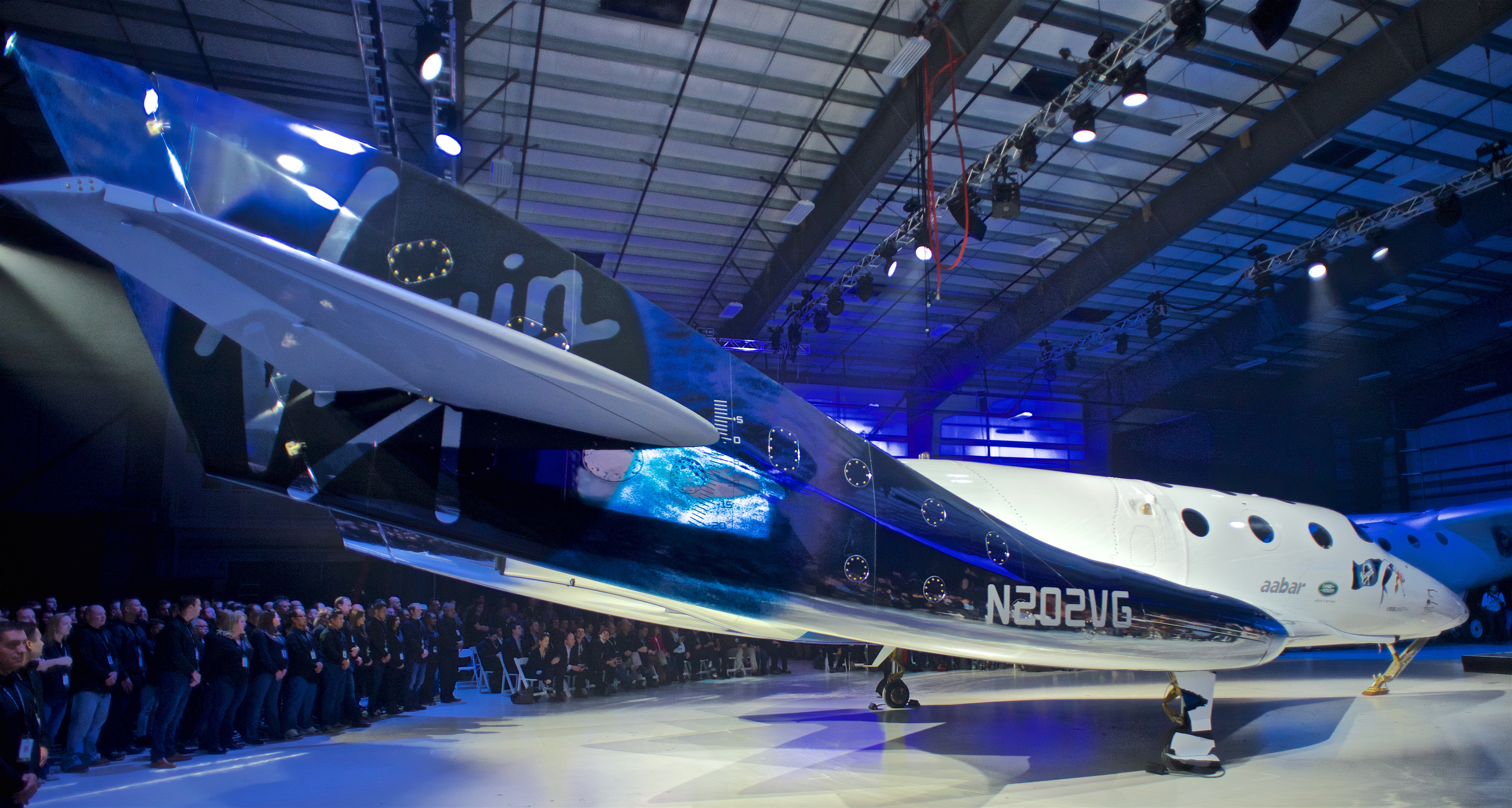
- VSS Unity in February 2016
- Names: Galactic 01 (official); Virgin Galactic Unity 23 (former)
- Mission type: Crewed suborbital spaceflight
- Operator: Virgin Galactic
- Mission duration: 14 min and 45 second
- Apogee: 85.1 km (52.9 mi)

Spacecraft properties
- Spacecraft: VSS Unity
- Spacecraft type: SpaceShipTwo
- Manufacturer: The Spaceship Company

Crew
- Members: Michael Masucci; Nicola Pecile; Walter Villadei; Angelo Landolfi; Pantaleone Carlucci; Colin Bennett

Start of mission
- Launch date: 29 June 2023 14:30:00 UTC
- Launch site: Spaceport America Runway 34
- Deployed from: VMS Eve

End of mission
- Landing date: 29 June 2023 15:42:28 UTC
- Landing site: Spaceport America Runway 34
- Galactic 01 mission patch VSS Unity spaceflights

Galactic 01, previously referred to as Unity 23, was a sub-orbital spaceflight of the SpaceShipTwo-class VSS Unity which launched on 29 June 2023. The launch was the first commercial spaceflight for Virgin Galactic. A research mission for the Italian Air Force, the crew consisted of pilots Michael Masucci and Nicola Pecile as well as crew members Colin Bennett, Walter Villadei, Angelo Landolfi, and Pantaleone Carlucci (National Research Council of Italy – CNR). The flight was postponed from its original planned October 2021 flight date for Virgin Galactic to upgrade its SpaceShipTwo vehicles.

During the flight, Villadei wore a suit to measure biometric data and his physiological responses to spaceflight. Landolfi carried out experiments on the effects of microgravity on cognitive performance, along with its effects on how materials mix. Carlucci's heart rate and other metrics were monitored through sensors during the flight.

== Crew ==
Position	Crew
Commander	(United States) Michael Masucci; Fourth spaceflight
Pilot	(Italy) Nicola Pecile; First spaceflight
Astronaut instructor	(United Kingdom) Colin Bennett; Second spaceflight
Virtute1 leader	(Italy) Walter Villadei; First spaceflight
Doctor	(Italy) Angelo Landolfi; First spaceflight
Researcher	(Italy) Pantaleone Carlucci; First spaceflight
