= VSS Unity VF-01 =

2019 American crewed sub-orbital spaceflight

VF-01
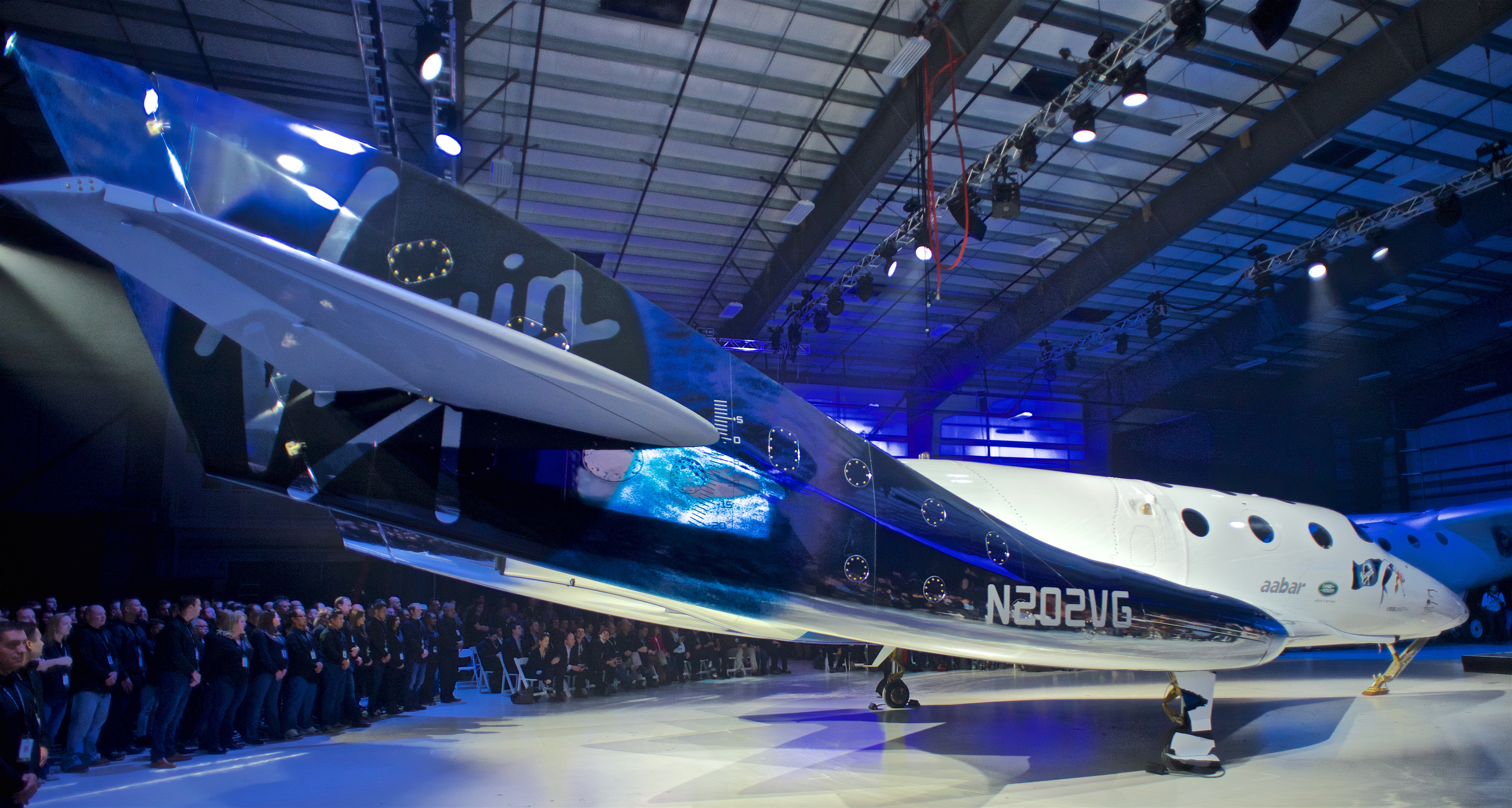
- VSS Unity in February 2016
- Mission type: Crewed suborbital spaceflight
- Operator: Virgin Galactic
- Mission duration: 15 minutes
- Apogee: 89.99 kilometres (55.92 miles)

Spacecraft properties
- Spacecraft: VSS Unity
- Spacecraft type: SpaceShipTwo
- Manufacturer: The Spaceship Company

Crew
- Members: David Mackay; Mike Masucci; Beth Moses

Start of mission
- Launch date: 22 February 2019, 16:57 UTC
- Launch site: Mojave Runway 30
- Deployed from: VMS Eve

End of mission
- Landing date: 22 February 2019, 17:23 UTC
- Landing site: Mojave Runway 30
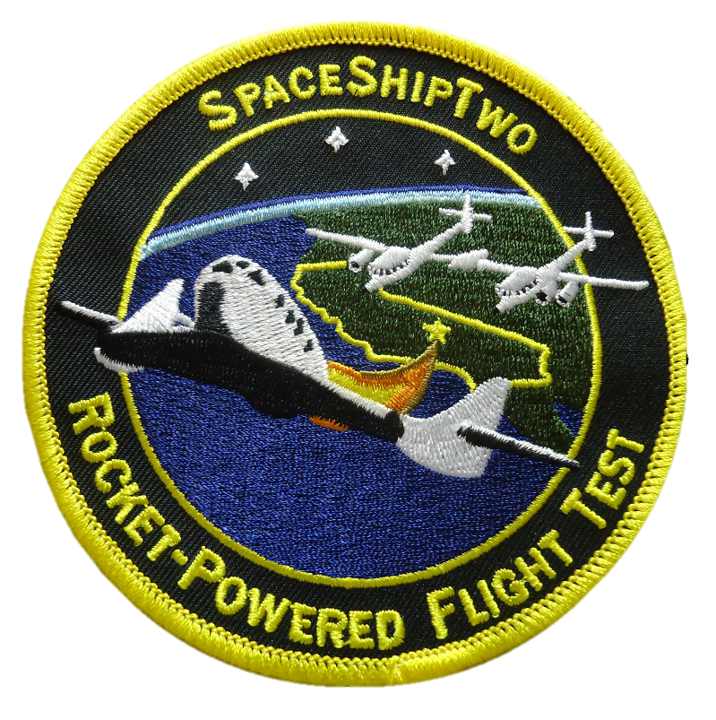
- VSS Unity VF-01 mission patch VSS Unity spaceflights

VF-01 was a sub-orbital spaceflight of the SpaceShipTwo-class VSS Unity that took place on 22 February 2019, piloted by David Mackay and co-piloted by Mike Masucci. It was operated by Virgin Galactic, a private company led by Richard Branson that intends to conduct space tourism flights in the future. Following VSS Unity VP-03, VF-01 was a demonstration of the craft's ability to carry passengers. Virgin Galactic's chief astronaut trainer Beth Moses acted as a test passenger, evaluating the experience for potential customers.

Reaching an apogee of 55.92 mi (89.99 km), the flight satisfied the United States definition of spaceflight (50 mi (80.47 km)), but fell short of the Kármán line (100 km (62.14 mi)), the Fédération Aéronautique Internationale definition. It was the highest flight of Unity and the SpaceShipTwo.

== Crew ==
Position	Astronaut
Commander	(United Kingdom) David Mackay; First spaceflight
Pilot	(United States) Michael Masucci; First spaceflight
Passenger	(United States) Beth Moses; First spaceflight

== Flight ==
On 22 February 2019, Unity's mother ship VMS Eve carried it into flight in a parasite configuration. Shortly before 9 a.m., Unity was drop launched. Pilots Mackay and Masucci flew Unity at a maximum Mach of 3.04 to a maximum altitude of over 55.9 mi (295,000 ft). This altitude surpassed the 50-mile limit used in the United States to denote the limit of space, but fell short of the Kármán line. Both craft landed safely afterwards. During flight, Moses unstrapped from her seat and experienced weightlessness. Per the U.S. convention, Moses was also the first woman aboard a commercial spacecraft.

After Unity 22 in 2021, when a red warning light incident occurred, The New Yorker published an article revealing that Unity had been damaged during the VF-01 flight: glue securing the trailing edge of the horizontal stabilizer gave way. Todd Ericson, vice-president of safety and test at Virgin Galactic, said he was surprised those aboard had not been killed, and ultimately resigned his position because he judged the company to take safety insufficiently seriously.
