= Virgin Galactic Unity 22 =

2021 American crewed sub-orbital spaceflight

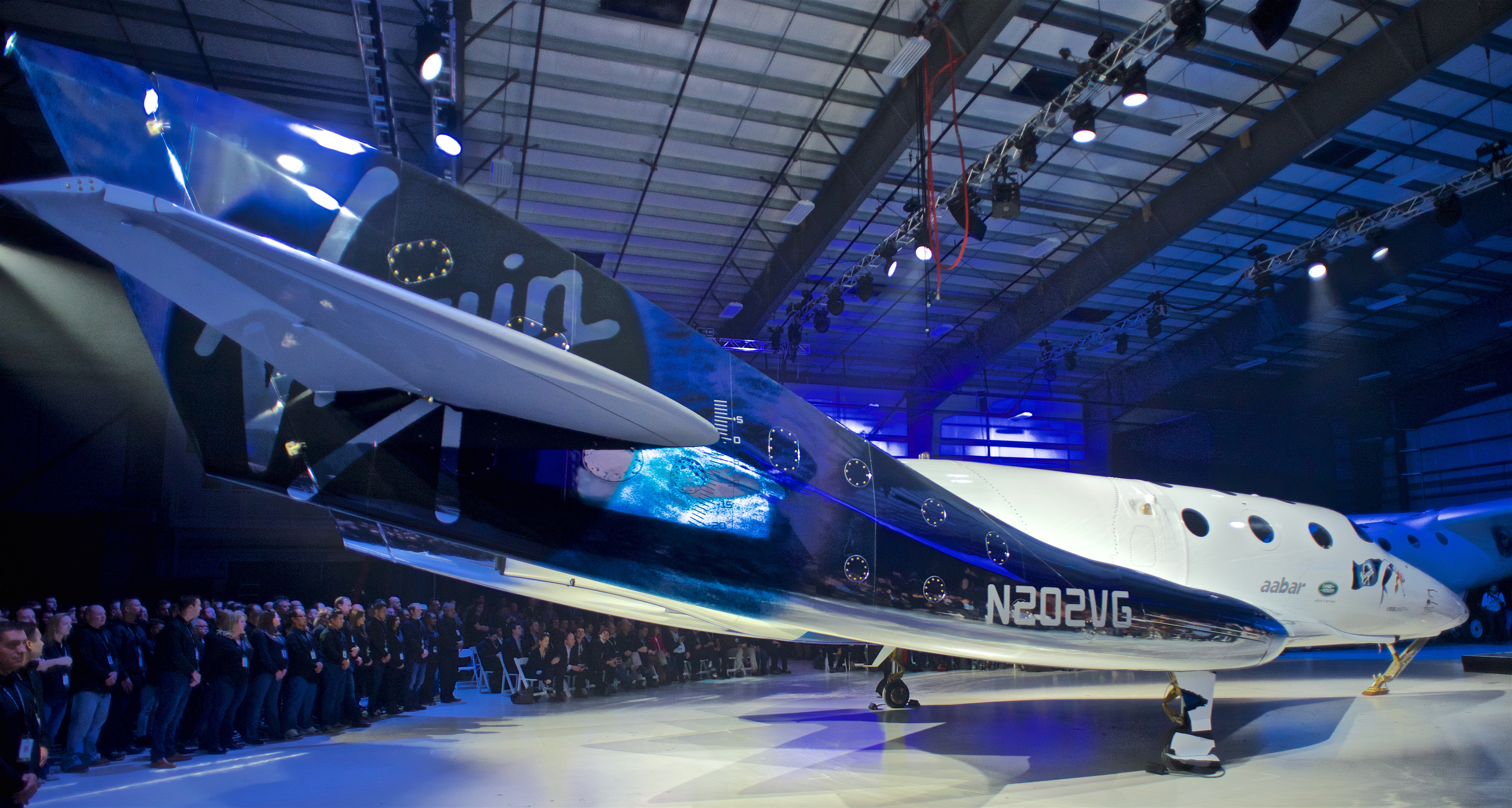
- VSS Unity in February 2016
- Mission type: Crewed suborbital spaceflight
- Operator: Virgin Galactic
- Website: www.virgingalactic.com
- Mission duration: 15 minutes and 17 seconds
- Apogee: 86.182 kilometres (53.551 miles)

Spacecraft properties
- Spacecraft: VSS Unity
- Spacecraft type: SpaceShipTwo
- Manufacturer: The Spaceship Company

Crew
- Members: David Mackay; Michael Masucci; Sirisha Bandla; Colin Bennett; Beth Moses; Richard Branson

Start of mission
- Launch date: 11 July 2021, 15:04 UTC
- Launch site: Spaceport America Runway 34
- Deployed from: VMS Eve

End of mission
- Landing date: 11 July 2021, 15:40 UTC
- Landing site: Spaceport America Runway 34
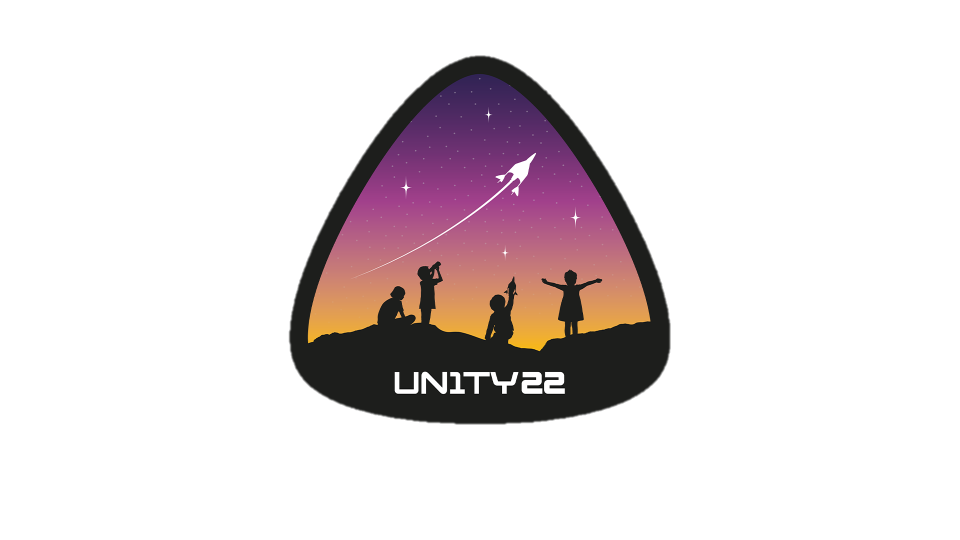
- Unity 22 patch VSS Unity spaceflights

Virgin Galactic Unity 22 was a sub-orbital spaceflight of the SpaceShipTwo-class VSS Unity which launched on 11 July 2021. The crew consisted of pilots David Mackay and Michael Masucci as well as passengers Sirisha Bandla, Colin Bennett, Beth Moses, and Richard Branson.

== Background ==
On 7 June 2021, Jeff Bezos announced that he planned to be on the first crewed flight of his company Blue Origin, which meant being aboard the first crewed flight to space (suborbital) of a private enterprise fully funded by private money with (2 possible different "record firsts" depending on whether one uses the international standard limit of space as 100 km altitude or the USA 50 mile altitude limit):

- A) in case of using the Karman line as the boundary of space, passengers (non-pilots) onboard, or
- B) in case of using the USAF/NASA 50 mile altitude limit for space, more than 1 passenger (i.e. non-pilot) aboard.

These two different "record firsts" are due to the fact that A) SpaceShipOne achieved the first crewed flight to space (suborbital, crossing the 100 km line) of a private enterprise fully funded by private money but with no passengers, only pilot, onboard and B) Virgin Galactic achieved the first crewed flight to space (suborbital, crossing the 50 mile line only) of a private enterprise fully funded by private money with 1 passenger onboard in addition to the pilots. (Note: These kind of crewed suborbital private spaceflights of a private enterprise fully funded by private money had happened before, such as SpaceShipOne flights and Virgin Galactic's previous spacefligths in 2018, 2019 and earlier 2021 (see VSS Unity).) In the following days, rumors began to spread that Richard Branson was filing paperwork to make a similar suborbital flight as part of his own private enterprise, beating Bezos to claim the above mentioned first achievements.

There has been debate whether Virgin Galactic, which gets close to, but possibly does not reach, the Kármán line, would in fact be achieving such a first commercial private flight to space. The United States and NASA defines the border of space to be 50 miles (80.5 km) above sea level (which is approximately the minimum possible altitude a satellite on a highly elliptical Earth orbit can reach and sustain its velocity). Australia and the FAI define outer space as above 100 kilometres (62 mi).

Despite the rivalry (dubbed the "billionaire space race"), shortly before the flight, Bezos offered well wishes to Branson. SpaceX founder and chief executive officer Elon Musk met with Branson shortly before the flight.

== Crew ==
Position	Crew
Commander	(United Kingdom) David Mackay; Third spaceflight
Pilot	(United States) Michael Masucci; Second spaceflight
Astronaut Instructor	(United States) Beth Moses; Second spaceflight
Passenger	(United Kingdom) Richard Branson; Only spaceflight
Passenger	(United Kingdom) Colin Bennett; First spaceflight
Passenger	(India) Sirisha Bandla; Only spaceflight

== Flight ==
At 8:40 AM MDT on 11 July 2021, Unity's mother ship VMS Eve took off carrying VSS Unity in a parasite configuration to be drop launched. During ascent a red warning light indicated a deviation from the ship's entry glide cone, but the flight was able to proceed and land successfully regardless. Two minutes and 38 seconds after release from Eve, Unity reached apogee at a 282773 ft (ca. 86.189 km or 53.6 miles) altitude (below the FAI's space boundary, the Kármán line's upper border at 100 km altitude, but above the United States' space boundary at 50 mi (264000 ft) and just above the mesopause at 86.182 km (53.551 mi). The persons on board experienced about four minutes of weightlessness. Unity then glided to a landing, 14 minutes and 17 seconds after release from Eve.

Due to the entry glide cone deviation and a departure from the planned route, the flight would later come under investigation by the Federal Aviation Administration. Virgin Galactic disputed the safety impact of the deviation, and noted they were cooperating with the FAA in the investigation, in a public statement. On September 2, 2021 it was publicly announced that SpaceShipTwo would be grounded by FAA order until the investigation into the flight deviance was complete. Former Virgin Galactic test pilot Mark P. Stucky would publicly call out on Twitter the flight deviation and Virgin Galactic's response by saying: "The most misleading statement today was Virgin Galactic's. The facts are the pilots failed to trim to achieve the proper pitch rate, the winds were well within limits, they did nothing of substance to address the trajectory error, and entered Class A airspace without authorization." The FAA cleared SpaceShipTwo flights to resume later in September, after deciding to expand the restricted airspace around the vehicle's flight range.

== Firsts achieved ==
The 11 July 2021 flight was the first time more than three people flew suborbitally on a spaceflight and the first time more than one passenger flew on a suborbital spaceflight, and Branson was the first founder of a spaceflight company to fly to space on his own company's craft, using the USAF/NASA definition of space as above 50 miles.
