= Virgin Galactic Unity 21 =

2021 American crewed sub-orbital spaceflight

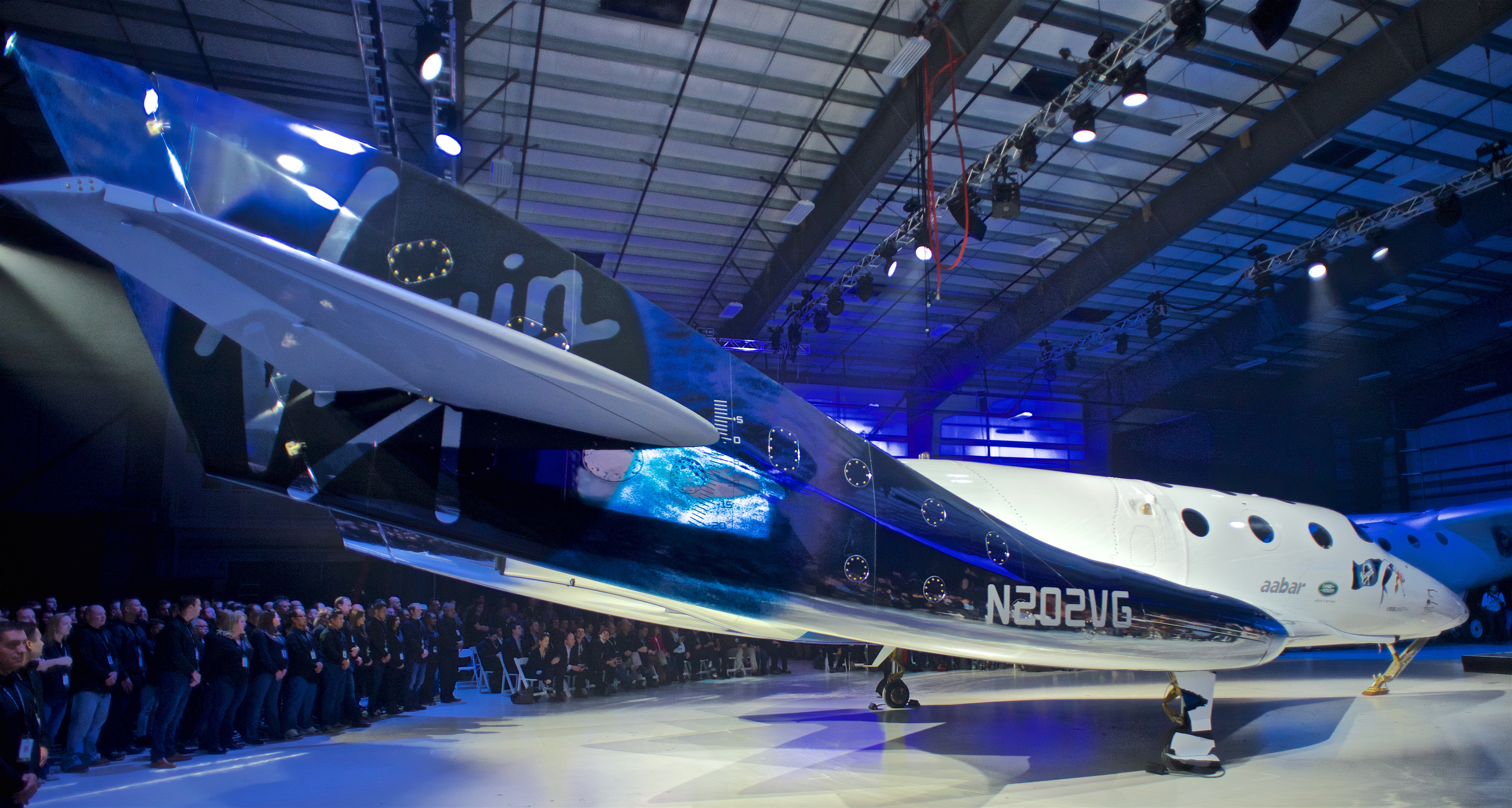
- VSS Unity in February 2016
- Mission type: Crewed suborbital spaceflight
- Operator: Virgin Galactic
- Apogee: 89.23 kilometres (55.44 miles)

Spacecraft properties
- Spacecraft: VSS Unity
- Spacecraft type: SpaceShipTwo
- Manufacturer: The Spaceship Company

Crew
- Members: David Mackay; Frederick Sturckow

Start of mission
- Launch date: 22 May 2021, 15:26 UTC
- Launch site: Spaceport America Runway 34
- Deployed from: VMS Eve

End of mission
- Landing date: 22 May 2021
- Landing site: Spaceport America Runway 16

Virgin Galactic Unity 21 was a sub-orbital spaceflight of the SpaceShipTwo-class VSS Unity which took place on 22 May 2021, piloted by David Mackay and co-piloted by Frederick Sturckow. It was the first human spaceflight from the state of New Mexico. It was operated by Virgin Galactic, a private company led by Richard Branson which intends to conduct space tourism flights in the future. Unity 21 was the first human spaceflight to be launched from Spaceport America.

Reaching an apogee of 55.45 mi (89.24 km), the flight satisfied the United States definition of spaceflight (50 mi (80.47 km)), but fell short of the Kármán line (100 km (62.14 mi)), the Fédération Aéronautique Internationale definition.

== Crew ==
Position	Astronaut
Pilot	(United States) Frederick Sturckow; Sixth spaceflight
Co-pilot	(United Kingdom) David Mackay; Second spaceflight

== Flight ==
On 22 May 2021, Unity's mother ship VMS Eve carried it into flight in a parasite configuration. At 15:26 UTC, Unity was drop launched. Pilots MacKay and Sturckow flew Unity at a maximum speed of Mach 3 to a maximum altitude of over 89.23 km (292,700 ft). This altitude surpassed the 50-mile limit used in the United States to denote the limit of space, but fell short of the Kármán line. Both craft landed safely afterwards.
