= Galactic 06 =

2024 private crewed suborbital spaceflight

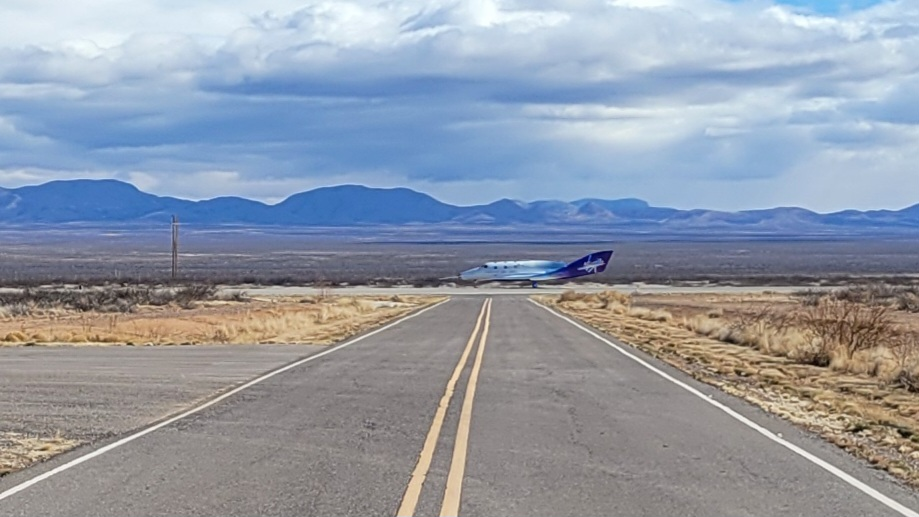
- Galactic 06 landing at Spaceport America
- Mission type: Crewed sub-orbital spaceflight
- Operator: Virgin Galactic
- Mission duration: 9 minutes
- Apogee: 88.8 km (55.2 mi)

Spacecraft properties
- Spacecraft: VSS Unity
- Spacecraft type: SpaceShipTwo
- Manufacturer: The Spaceship Company

Crew
- Crew size: 6
- Members: CJ Sturckow; Nicola Pecile; Lina Borozdina; Robie Vaughn; Franz Haider; Neil Kornswiet

Start of mission
- Launch date: 26 January 2024, 17:00 UTC
- Launch site: Spaceport America Runway 34
- Deployed from: VMS Eve

End of mission
- Landing date: 26 January 2024, 17:56 UTC
- Landing site: Spaceport America Runway 34
- Galactic 06 mission patch VSS Unity spaceflights

Galactic 06 was a crewed sub-orbital spaceflight of the SpaceShipTwo-class VSS Unity, which launched on 26 January 2024. It was the sixth commercial spaceflight and eleventh overall spaceflight for American aerospace company Virgin Galactic.

== Crew ==
Galactic 06's crew included four private passengers and two Virgin Galactic employees. First mission without an astronaut instructor on board. Franz Haider became the second Austrian citizen in space after Franz Viehböck, while Lina Borozdina became the first Ukrainian woman in space.

Position	Crew
Commander	(United States) CJ Sturckow; Tenth spaceflight
Pilot	(Italy) Nicola Pecile; Third spaceflight
Tourist	(Ukraine) / (United States) Lina Borozdina; First spaceflight
Tourist	(United States) Robie Vaughn; First spaceflight
Tourist	(Austria) Franz Haider; First spaceflight
Tourist	(United States) Neil Kornswiet; First spaceflight

== See also ==
- List of spaceflight launches in January–June 2024
