= David Mackay (pilot) =

Scottish astronaut (born 1957)

- Born: Helmsdale, Scotland
- Education: University of Glasgow
- Space career

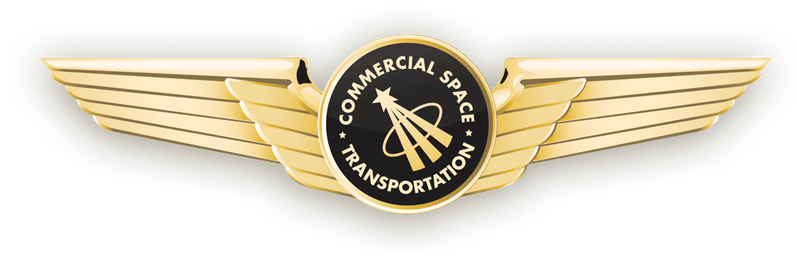
Commercial astronaut SpaceShipTwo pilot
- Current occupation: Chief pilot at Virgin Galactic
- Status: Active
- Time in space: ~35m
- Missions: VSS Unity VF-01; Virgin Galactic Unity 21; Virgin Galactic Unity 22
- Mission insignia

David William Donald Mackay AFC (born 1957) is the Chief Pilot of Virgin Galactic, a commercial astronaut and a former RAF test pilot. He is the first native-born Scot to visit space.

== Early life ==
David Mackay was born in Scotland, and lived in Helmsdale, Highland. David's father was a police officer. He would see aircraft flying (low) from RAF Lossiemouth.

David studied Aeronautical Engineering at the University of Glasgow. He first piloted an aircraft in 1977.

== Career ==
=== Royal Air Force ===
He joined the RAF in 1979. He flew the Harrier GR3 in Germany and the Falklands.

=== Test pilot ===
In 1986 he was selected for test pilot training. In 1988 he graduated from the French test pilots' school, École du personnel navigant d'essais et de réception - EPNER, through an exchange with the RAF's Empire Test Pilots' School. He became Commanding Officer of the RAF's Fast Jet Test Flight in 1992 at RAF Boscombe Down. The fastest speed he reached was Mach 1.4 in a French Mirage. He conducted trials on the Harrier GR7, the Sea Harrier FA.2, and the Tucano. He flew with the Fixed Wing Test Squadron. He was awarded the Air Force Cross in 1992.

=== Virgin Atlantic ===
He joined Virgin Atlantic in 1995, flying Boeing 747s as a Captain from 1999; he also flew the Airbus A340 from 2002. He finished his flying career with over 11,000 hours flying.

=== Virgin Galactic ===
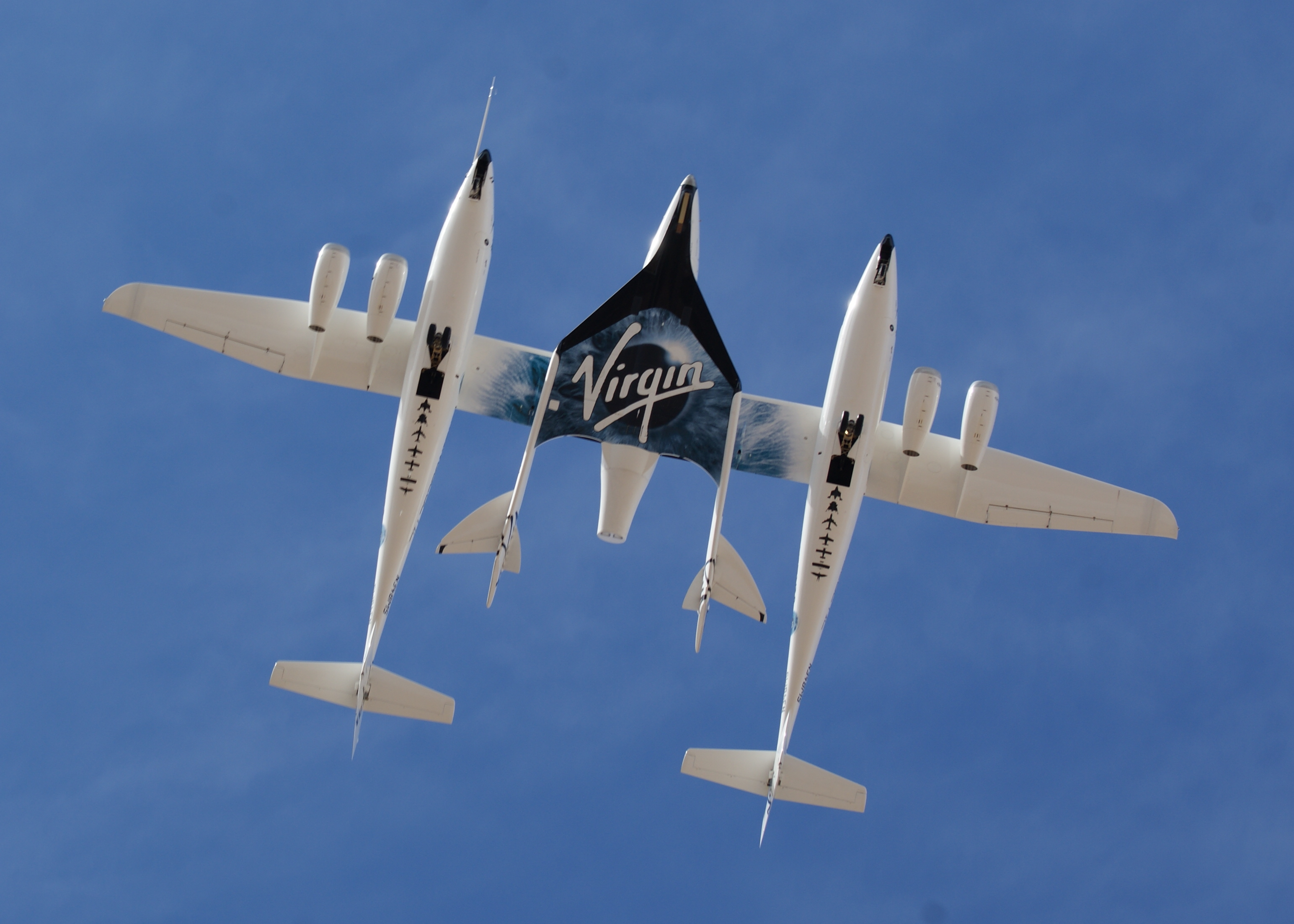
SpaceShip Two

He joined Virgin Galactic in 2009, and is now the Chief Pilot. The suborbital spacecraft, SpaceShipTwo (SS2), will reach a height of 360,000 feet. On its journey into space, the SS2 spacecraft will reach Mach 3.5. The first SS2 spacecraft to fly, of which he was one of the pilots, was the VSS Enterprise; the second SS2 spacecraft is called VSS Unity. On 22 February 2019 Mackay became the 569th person, and first Scot, to visit space. He piloted the VSS Unity VF-01 flight above 50 mi (80 km), qualifying him as an FAA commercial astronaut. He has since piloted the Unity 21 and Unity 22 flights, also above 50 mi (80 km).
