= Nicola Pecile =

Commercial astronaut

- Born: March 11, 1973 (age 53); Udine, Italy
- Education: Accademia Aeronautica
- Space career

Commercial astronaut SpaceShipTwo pilot
- Current occupation: Pilot at Virgin Galactic
- Status: Active
- Flight time: 49 minutes and 57 seconds
- Missions: Galactic 01; Galactic 03; Galactic 06; Galactic 07
- Mission insignia

Nicola Pecile (born March 11, 1973, Udine) is an Italian commercial astronaut who works for Virgin Galactic.

He graduated from the Accademia Aeronautica and served with the Aeronautica Militare (Italian Air Force) flying Panavia Tornado combat aircraft. Selected to train as a test pilot, he qualified at the EPNER school in 2003. As a test pilot, he tested new armament integrations for the Tornado and AMX International AMX He completed a master's degree in Astronautical Engineering at the School of Aerospace Engineering of La Sapienza, Rome.

In 2011, he retired from the air force and migrated to the United States. There, he taught at the National Test Pilot School in Mojave, California. In 2015, he joined Virgin Galactic to work on the SpaceShipTwo program.

As of 2023, he had logged 8,000 flying hours on 170 different aircraft.

== Sources ==
- Cocetta, Alberto (April 11, 2021). "In volo con Nicola "Stick" Pecile, nato per salire sempre più in alto". Megazine.
- Di Meo, Roberto (September 23, 2021). "Nicola pecile, il pilota italiano che porta i turisti ai confini dello spazio". Stradenuove.
- "Il friulano Nicola Pecile ai comandi della navetta di Virgin Galactic". Friulioggi. June 30, 2023.
- "Mr. Nicola Pecile". Aeronautica Militare. November 6, 2023.
