= Beth Moses =

American commercial astronaut

Natalie Beth Moses
- Education: Purdue University, B.S. 1992; M.S. 1994
- Spouse: Mike Moses
- Occupation: Commercial astronaut trainer
- Space career

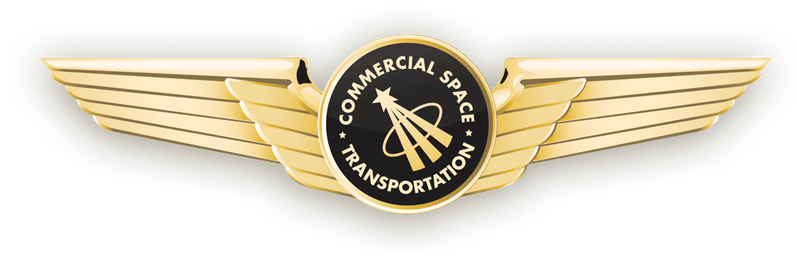
Virgin Galactic commercial astronaut
- Status: Active
- Flight time: 1 hour, 23 minutes and 55 seconds
- Mission: VF-01, Unity 22, Unity 25, Galactic 02, Galactic 03, Galactic 04

Beth Moses is a commercial astronaut, former interiors program manager, and former chief astronaut instructor for Virgin Galactic's SpaceShipTwo program. She was the first woman to make a spaceflight on a commercially launched vehicle, the VSS Unity VF-01 flight of 22 February 2019. She was also part of the six-member crew that flew in the first fully-crewed (Note: The SpaceShipTwo vehicles (like VSS Unity) are designed for 8 people, 6 passengers and 2 pilots, so whether this flight was fully-crewed is debatable. But it is true that at the time of this flight, only 4 of the passenger seats were installed in VSS Unity, so in this sense this flight was fully-crewed.) test flight to space on July 11, 2021, aboard VSS Unity.

== Career ==
Natalie Beth Stubbings grew up in Northbrook, Illinois, and attended Glenbrook North High School. She obtained bachelor's (1992) and master's (1994) degrees in aeronautical and astronautical engineering from Purdue University School of Aeronautics and Astronautics and was a senior engineer in the NASA/JSC EVA Project Office. As a student, she conducted materials research in parabolic flight.

She worked for NASA as the assembly manager for the International Space Station (ISS) where she led the global program of human-in-the-loop testing which designed, developed, and verified the spacewalk mechanisms used to assemble and maintain the station. Moses later joined Virgin Galactic where she is chief astronaut instructor and interiors program manager

During her spaceflight on February 22, 2019, she became the first person on a suborbital mission known to have unstrapped and floated around the cabin, as part of her job evaluating the future passenger experience. On mission VF-01 she reached a height of 89.9 kilometres (55.9 mi) above the Earth's surface. The Federal Aviation Administration awarded her the Commercial Astronaut Wings as a result of this mission.

== Quotes ==
"One of the things that I believe in is that if a greater slice of humanity can experience spaceflight, it will translate to untold benefits and changes on Earth. What if every world leader saw Earth from space? It might be a more gentle, kind planet."

"After countless projects, I can say this: engineering persistence trumps personal, cultural, or gender factors. In modern global human aerospace, it really doesn’t matter what you look like. Or where your parents lived. Or even what native language you grew up with. What does matter is your engineering skill, common sense, courtesy, persistence, and dedication to the shared mission."

== Recognition ==
Beth Moses was awarded the National Science Foundation's Microgravity Research Award. This allowed her to further her research in parabolic flight. In 2009 the ISS was awarded the Robert J. Collier trophy; Moses played a large role in the development required to attain this. In 2021, she was awarded the Distinguished Alumni Award from Glenbrook North High School in Northbrook, IL.
