= Keisha Schahaff and Anastatia Mayers =

Antiguan and Barbudan spacewomen

Keisha Schahaff (born 1976 or 1977) is an Antiguan and Barbudan, who, along with her daughter, Anastatia Mayers (born 2004) are space tourists who are the first citizens from Antigua and Barbuda (and English-speaking Caribbean) and the first mother and daughter duo to fly to space (Lane Bess and Cameron Bess were the first parent and child (father and son) on the same spaceflight, Blue Origin NS-19). Their Galactic 02 launch occurred on 10 August 2023, with an apogee of 55 miles (89 km). According to the United States definition of the boundary of space at 50 miles (80 km), Anastatia, at 18, is the youngest person to have gone into space, beating Oliver Daemen. According to the Kármán line definition at 100 kilometres (62 mi), Daemen remains the youngest.

== Space travel ==
In 2021, the duo won tickets for the Galactic 02 launch, typically sold for $450,000, through a drawing held by Virgin Galactic. The draw, which required a minimum donation of $10, was held as part of a charity event raising funds for the non-profit organization Space For Humanity. Schahaff received a pledge of support by tourism minister Charles Fernandez on behalf of the nation and the Ministry of Tourism and Investment. The trip, launched 10 August 2023, was the company's seventh spaceflight, second commercial space flight, and first private passenger launch. The expedition was expected to last a minimum of 90 minutes. Prior to the launch, all passengers underwent a "full medical examination by a doctor approved by the Federal Aviation Administration (FAA), [...] many medical records checks," and pre-flight training. When asked about the risks involved in the mission, Mayers stated, “We all need to get out of our comfort zones and try new things, to believe in ourselves." In a loving tribute to her homeland, Schahaff stated: “’What makes it even more extraordinary is that I have the chance to represent my beloved country, Antigua and Barbuda, and pave the way for our nation and community as the first astronauts.“

== Biographies ==
=== Schahaff ===
Schahaff was born in 1976 or 1977. She is an entrepreneur and health and wellness coach, and has two daughters.

=== Mayers ===
Mayers attended Island Academy in Bendals village, the only international school in Antigua and Barbuda. As of July 2023, she is a second-year student at the University of Aberdeen, where she is studying philosophy and physics. When asked about her program of study, she stated, "Philosophy and physics make an interesting combination, but it expresses both my love for science and my curiosity about how the world works."

== See also ==
- Galactic 02
- Galactic 01
- Antigua and Barbuda
- Antigua Recreation Ground
- Antigua
- Barbuda
- Oliver Daemen
