= Ken Baxter (businessman) =

Real estate investor

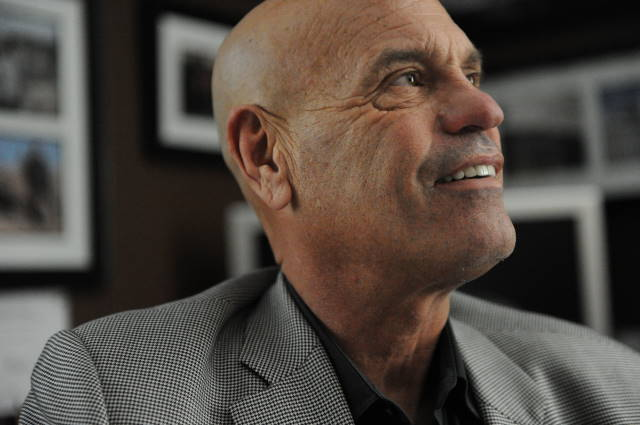
- Ken Baxter at his PMA Realty office in Las Vegas, NV
- Born: May 15, 1949 (age 77); Cortland, NY

Ken "Rocket Man" Baxter (born May 15, 1949) is a real estate investor who became the first everyday American to travel to space on September 8, 2023. Baxter purchased the first ticket sold to a civilian to be a passenger on Virgin Galactic in 2004.

== Early life ==
Baxter was born in Cortland, New York on May 15, 1949. The son of Hoyt H. Baxter and Maria "Zuza" (Alzbeta) Kramerova Baxter, he and his family relocated to Orem, Utah in 1954. He graduated from Orem High School in 1967. Baxter is the eldest of five siblings. He has two sisters, Radana (Clark) and Julie (Dansie), along with two brothers, Mike and David.

== Career ==
In a career spanning over four decades, Baxter has closed over 56,000 real estate transactions. He began his career in Idaho Falls, Idaho at the age of twenty-one in 1970, owning and operating a boutique-style operation selling automobile and home stereos. By 1973, Baxter translated his sales aptitude to the Real Estate business by hiring, motivating, and training a staff of nearly 100 new home specialists at Heartland Realty in Salt Lake City. In the 1980s, Baxter liquidated all of the REO high rise inventory in Salt Lake City. Relocating to Las Vegas in 1990, Baxter continued his real estate career by opening his first real estate brokerage firm in Nevada. Today Baxter carries on the tradition of "Rebuilding Las Vegas, One Family at a Time" through his Las Vegas real estate office, PMA Realty and his real estate investment and residential redevelopment company, Apollo Realty Investments. Baxter has also ventured into the new homes market via his new home building company, Liberty Homes. Baxter has provided single story, semi-custom homes in Northwest Las Vegas since 2012.

== Space tourism ==
Baxter publicly credits his fascination with the space program to reading From the Earth to the Moon by Jules Verne as a young boy. Baxter holds the distinction of First Founder of Virgin Galactic, a space tourism company announced by Sir Richard Branson on September 25, 2004.

Baxter purchased the first commercial space flight ticket at $200,000 USD after viewing a 60 Minutes segment featuring Burt Rutan, winner of the $10,000,000 X Prize for the first non-governmental organization to launch a reusable crewed spacecraft into space twice within two weeks, and thereafter, earning him the nickname "Rocket Man."

Rutan is also the designer of Sir Richard Branson's SpaceShipTwo, which attached to the mother ship, will be carried to about 16 kilometers or 52,000 feet by a carrier aircraft, White Knight Two. At that point, when the carrier aircraft reaches its maximum height, the SpaceShipTwo vehicle will separate and continue to 110 km (the Kármán line), a common definition of where "space" begins. Despite the crash of the first iteration of SpaceShipTwo during a test flight on October 31, 2014, Baxter remained optimistic about his upcoming flight, holding his place at the top of the passenger list to ultimately become the world's first commercial space tourist.

Baxter’s dream of space travel was finally realized on September 8, 2023 at 8:30 am MDT, when he became Virgin Galactic Astronaut 014, and Astronaut 666 overall, the first everyday American to experience the thrill of zero gravity, 90 kilometers above the surface of the earth. In a recent interview, Baxter expressed his wonder and appreciation for the privilege of joining the elite collection of human beings, beginning with Soviet cosmonaut Yuri Gagarin in 1961, to be forever known as astronauts.

In 2025, Baxter discussed his Virgin Galactic spaceflight in a televised interview on Fine Point with Chanel Rion, broadcast over Thanksgiving weekend on One America News Network.

== Philanthropy ==
Baxter has contributed his time and resources to several charitable endeavors. Through his public charity, Green Global, Baxter acts as an advocate for protecting our planet's precious resources including preserving our rainforests and oceans, exposing carbon fraud schemes, and promoting conservation. Ken is passionate about saving the Amazon rainforest from the ill effects of deforestation on the region. Another of Baxter's public charities, Made In America, prides itself for being the driving force of the New Industrial Revolution in America and is dedicated to supporting and strengthening the return and retention of American jobs in the manufacturing sector in an effort to reignite the economic recovery of the US. Made In America has also donated technology equipment to needy schools in and around the Las Vegas Valley. Parent organization, the Ken and Linda Baxter Family Foundation, was established in 2005 and provides philanthropic grants for education, research and the environment.
