= Jon Goodwin (canoeist) =

British canoeist

Jon Stuart Goodwin (born 16 June 1943) is a British retired slalom canoeist who competed in the early 1970s. He was a competitor in the C-2 slalom event at the 1972 Summer Olympics in Munich. He is married to fellow Olympic canoeist Pauline Goodwin.

He has been a regular and leading competitor in the Ferrari Hillclimb Championship since 1992, winning in 2002 and 2008, and has more Class wins than any other competitor (as at end 2020 season).

On August 10, 2023, he was onboard Virgin Galactic's first spaceflight for tourists. Goodwin, who has Parkinson's disease, said he wanted to be an inspiration to others. In a statement, he said "I hope this inspires all others facing adversity and shows them challenges don't have to inhibit or stop them from pursuing their dreams."
