= Tuva Cihangir Atasever =

Turkish astronaut (born 1992)

- Born: 12 August 1992 (age 34); Ankara, Turkey
- Citizenship: Turkish
- Education: Bilkent University (BS); University of California
- Occupations: Commercial astronaut; Engineer
- Space career

Virgin Galactic; Commercial astronaut
- Missions: Galactic 07

Tuva Cihangir Atasever (born 12 August 1992) is the second Turkish astronaut of the Turkish Space Agency. He was a backup crew member for Axiom Mission 3, and he flew on Galactic 07 in June 2024.

Atasever's mother is of Azerbaijani origin, and he carried the flags of both Turkey and Azerbaijan to space. To support Palestine, he brought a keffiyeh to space and pushed for seeing the world as a single "spaceship" without nations or borders.
