= VMS Eve =

Virgin Galactic mother ship

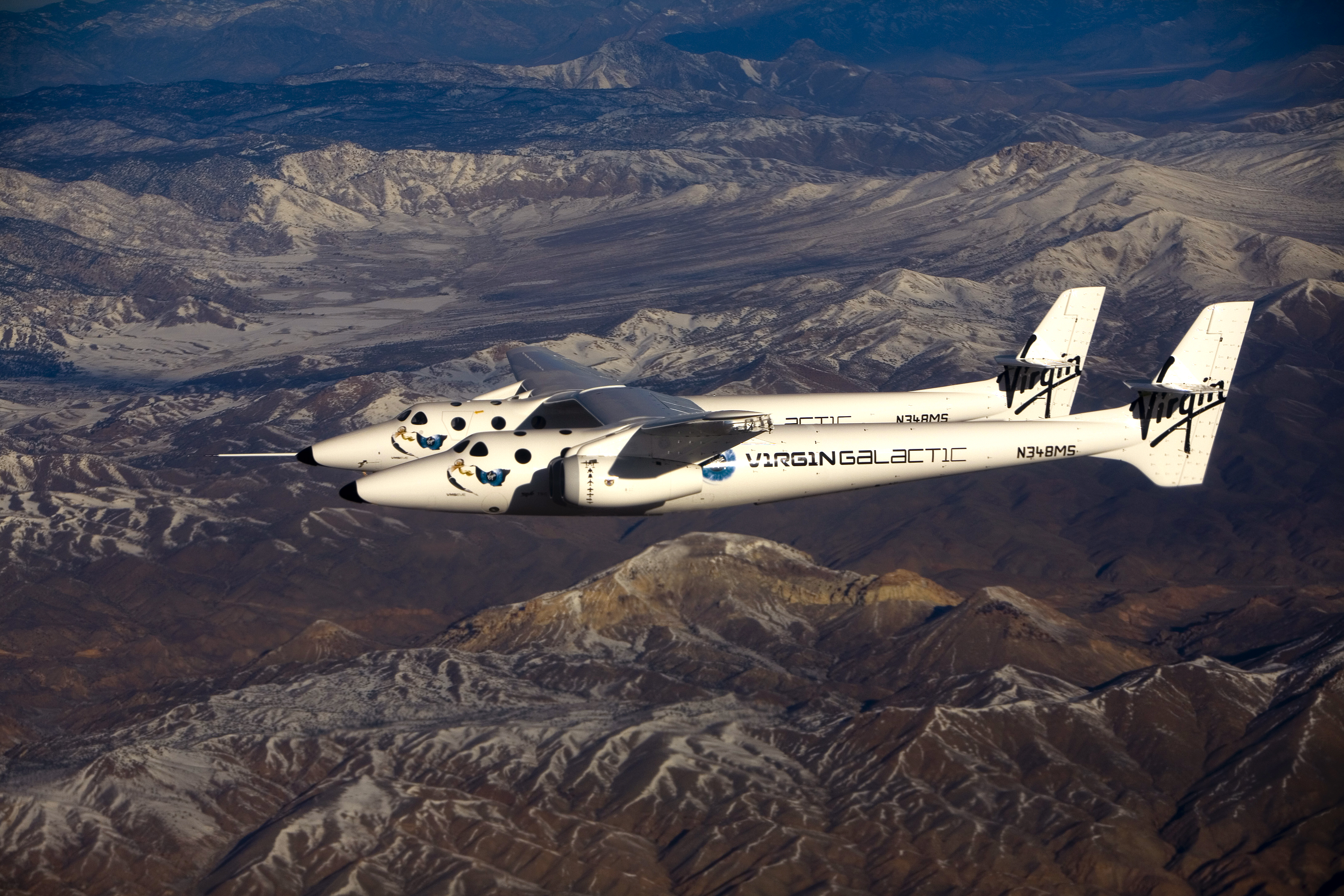
- VMS Eve's maiden flight

General information
- Type: WhiteKnightTwo
- National origin: United States
- Manufacturer: Scaled Composites
- Designer: Robert Morgan, James Tighe
- Primary user: Virgin Galactic
- Number built: 1
- Construction number: 001
- Registration: N348MS

History
- First flight: 21 December 2008
- Developed from: White Knight One

Virgin MotherShip (VMS) Eve (Tail number: N348MS) is a carrier mothership for Virgin Galactic and launch platform for SpaceShipTwo-class Virgin SpaceShips.

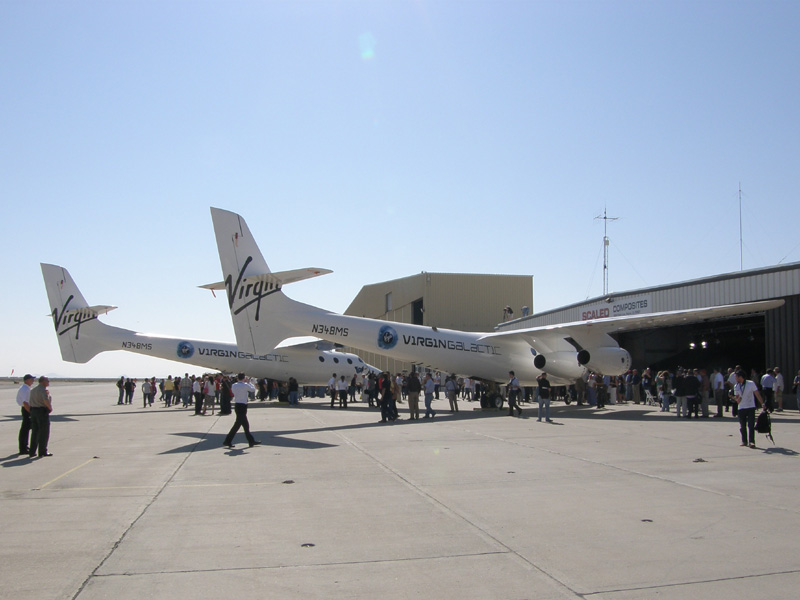
WhiteKnightTwo at its rollout and christening ceremony, July 28, 2008

VMS Eve was built by Scaled Composites for Virgin Galactic.

== Public launch ==
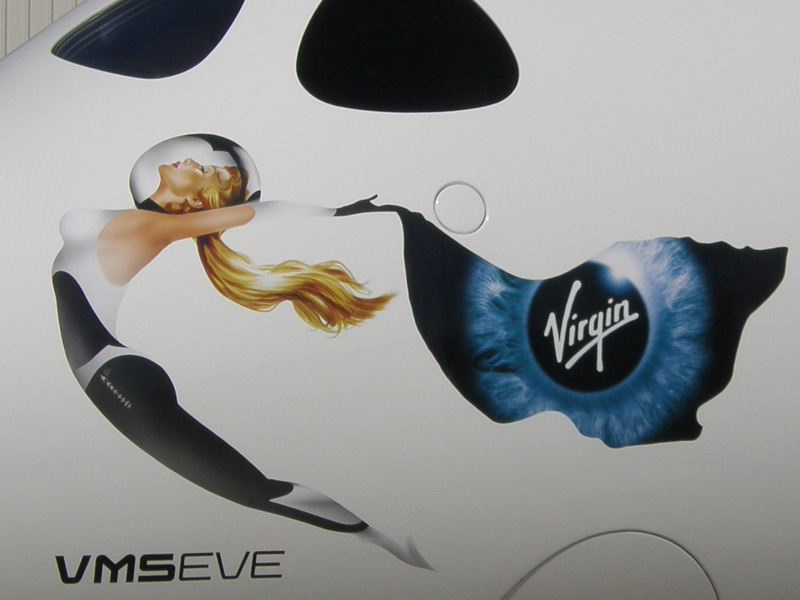
VMS Eve's nose art

The aircraft was named after Evette Branson, the mother of Richard Branson, Chairman of the Virgin Group. The jet plane has nose art of a blonde woman holding a banner with the Virgin Galactic logo. The image is based on how Evette Branson looked when she was younger and is called Galactic Girl. The aircraft was officially launched on July 28, 2008, in Mojave, California, the United States, at the Mojave Spaceport, home of Scaled Composites. On December 12, 2008, the aircraft performed first taxi tests, and a week later the maiden flight. Eve was used in the Virgin Galactic testflight program before entry into commercial usage.

Burt Rutan has dismissed fears that pressurization cycles might induce fatigue failure in the composite structure. Richard Branson has also announced that it will be highly fuel efficient.

== Flight test program ==
The initial flight occurred on 21 December 2008, after an initial low speed taxi test was carried out at Mojave followed by a high speed taxi on 16 December. By September 2009 the flight envelope was extended to 50000 feet. As of 19 September 2014 the total flight time for WhiteKnightTwo was 333.96 hours.

As of September 22, 2025, there have been 3 test flights after 2014. One in October 2021, where it flew from Spaceport America to Mojave for extensive testing, and two in February 2023, the first being on February 15th, when it conducted a flight from the Mojave Air and Space Port, which lasted over 2 and 1/2 hours, and reached an altitude of 41,500 ft (12,650 meters).

== See also ==
- Blue Origin LPV Jacklyn, Blue Origin vehicle named after the founder's mother
