= List of Virgin Galactic launches =

SpaceShipOne
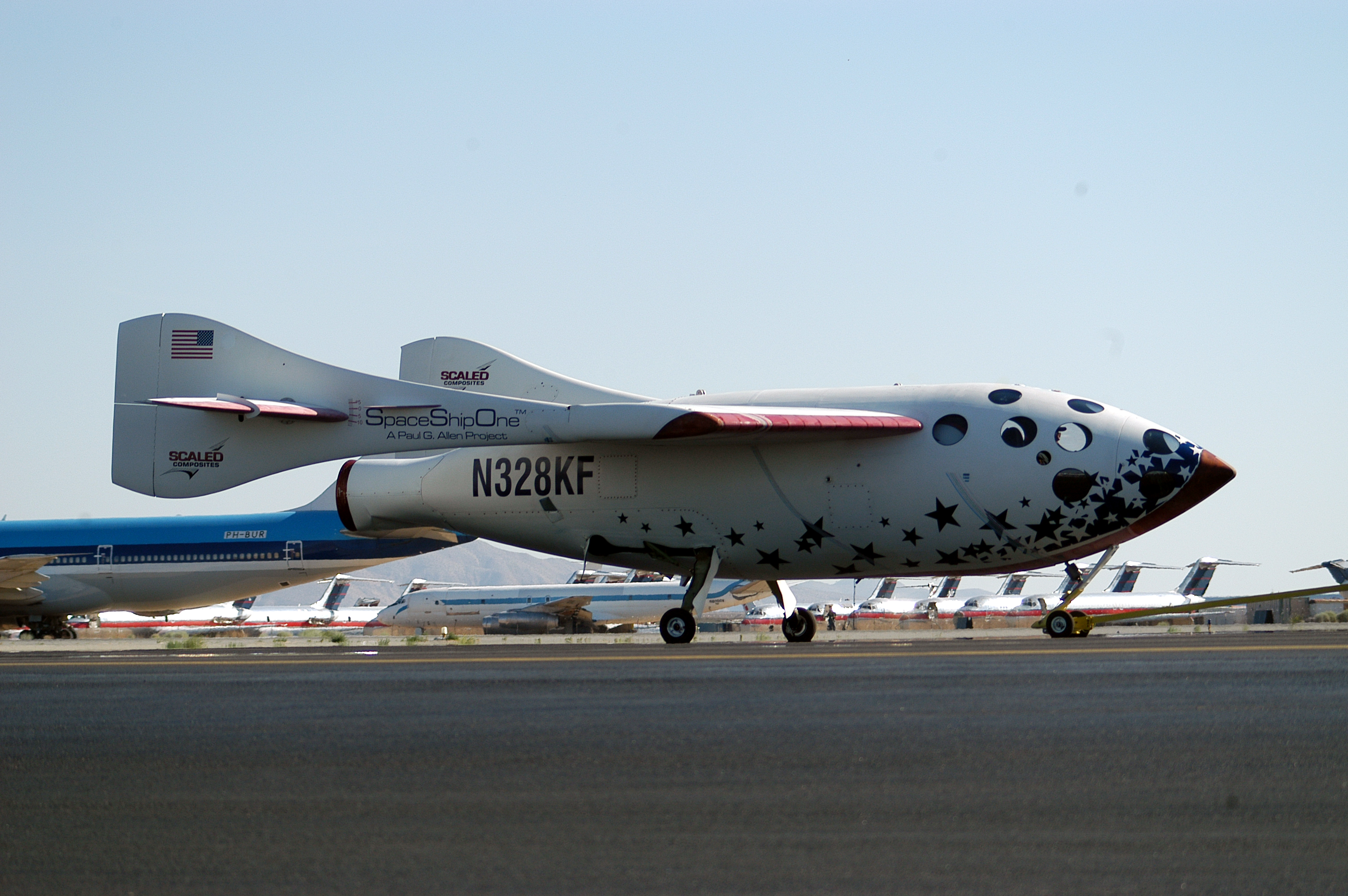
- SpaceShipOne after its flight into space, June 2004.

General information
- Type: Spaceplane
- Manufacturer: Scaled Composites
- Designer: Burt Rutan
- Primary user: Mojave Aerospace Ventures
- Number built: 1

History
- First flight: 20 May 2003
- Retired: 4 October 2004
- Developed into: SpaceShipTwo
- Preserved at: National Air and Space Museum

SpaceShipTwo
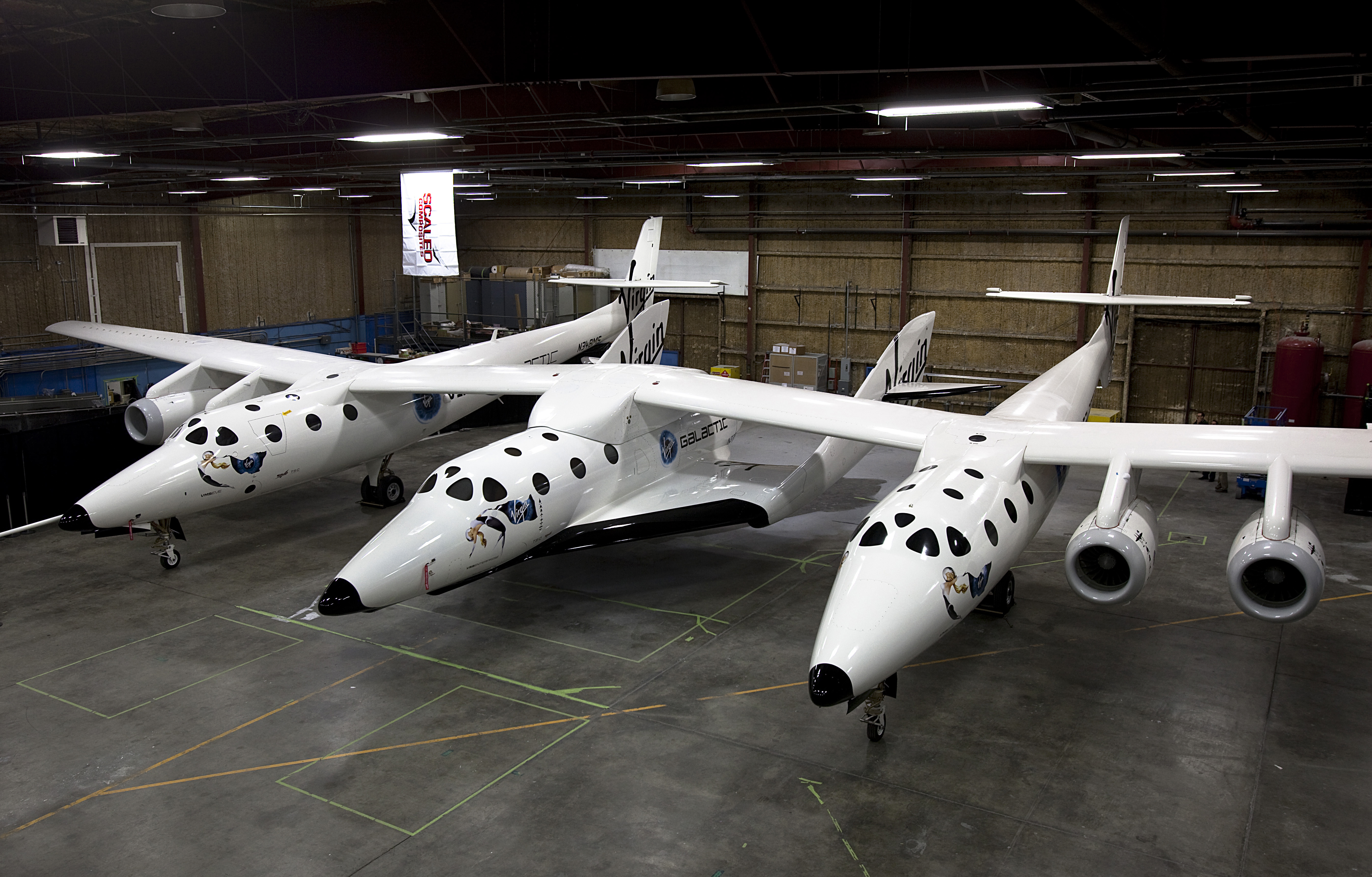
- SpaceShipTwo (central fuselage) carried under its twin fuselage mother ship, White Knight Two.

General information
- Type: Passenger spaceplane
- National origin: United States
- Manufacturer: Scaled Composites (1st aircraft); The Spaceship Company
- Primary user: Virgin Galactic
- Number built: 2

History
- First flight: 10 October 2010 (first glide flight); 29 April 2013 (first powered flight); 13 December 2018 (first spaceflight)
- Developed from: Scaled Composites SpaceShipOne
- Developed into: The Spaceship Company SpaceShip III

VSS Enterprise (N339SS)
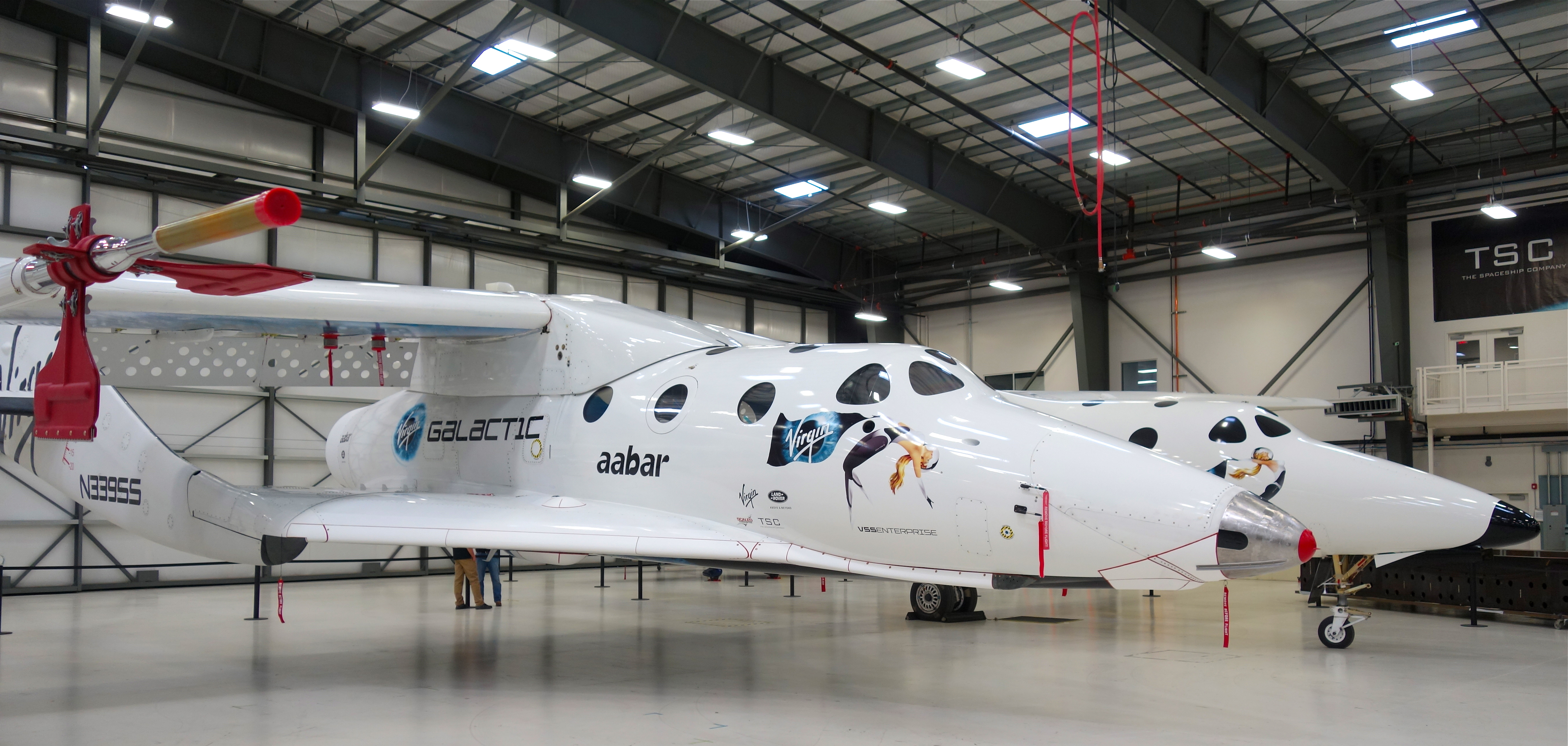
- VSS Enterprise, the first SpaceShipTwo spaceplane, attached to its carrier aircraft WhiteKnightTwo VMS Eve

General information
- Type: Scaled Composites Model 339 SpaceShipTwo
- Manufacturer: Scaled Composites
- Status: Destroyed
- Owners: Virgin Galactic
- Construction number: 1
- Registration: N339SS

History
- First flight: 10 October 2010 (crewed gliding flight) 29 April 2013 (powered flight)
- Fate: Crashed; 31 October 2014

VSS Unity
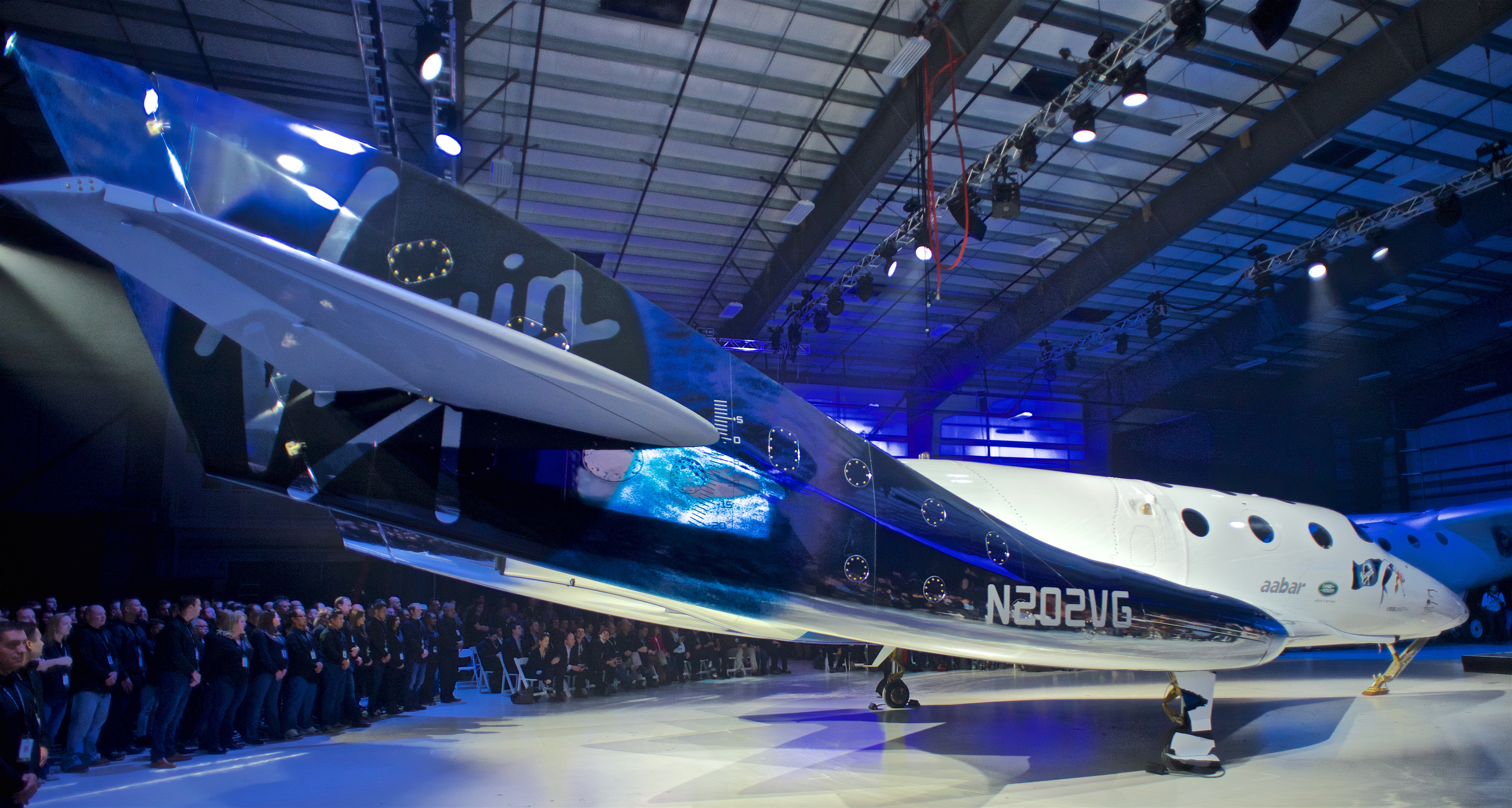
- Virgin Galactic SpaceShipTwo Unity rollout, 19 February 2016, FAITH hangar, Mojave, California

General information
- Type: Scaled Composites Model 339 SpaceShipTwo
- Manufacturer: The Spaceship Company
- Owners: Virgin Galactic
- Construction number: 2
- Registration: N202VG

History
- First flight: 8 September 2016 (captive carry flight); 3 December 2016 (glide flight); 5 April 2018 (powered flight); 13 December 2018 (suborbital spaceflight)
- In service: Retired
- Fate: Retired 8 June 2024

SpaceShip III

General information
- Type: Suborbital air-launched passenger rocket-spaceplane
- National origin: United States
- Manufacturer: The Spaceship Company
- Designer: Virgin Galactic
- Status: Under development
- Primary user: Virgin Galactic
- Number built: 1

History
- Manufactured: since 2021
- Introduction date: 2021
- Developed from: SpaceShipTwo

The following is a list of Virgin Galactic launches since 2003.

== Virgin Galactic launch ==
The Virgin Galactic series of vehicles, starting with SpaceShipOne, are more comparable to the X-15 than orbiting spacecraft like the Space Shuttle. Accelerating a spacecraft to orbital speed requires more than 60 times as much energy as accelerating it to Mach 3. It would also require an elaborate heat shield to safely dissipate that energy during re-entry.

=== SpaceShipOne ===
Although not a Virgin Galactic launcher, SpaceShipOne was the direct predecessor of the Virgin Galactic vehicles, and served to demonstrate the feasibility of the concept. SpaceShipOne was an experimental air-launched rocket-powered aircraft with sub-orbital spaceflight capability at speeds of up to 3,000 ft/s (900 m/s), using a hybrid rocket motor. The design featured a unique "feathering" atmospheric reentry system where the rear half of the wing and the twin tail booms folds 70 degrees upward along a hinge running the length of the wing; this increases drag while retaining stability. SpaceShipOne completed the first crewed private spaceflight in 2004. That same year, it won the US$10 million Ansari X Prize and was immediately retired from active service. Its mother ship was named "White Knight". Both craft were developed and flown by Mojave Aerospace Ventures, which was a joint venture between Paul Allen and Scaled Composites, Burt Rutan's aviation company. Allen provided the funding of approximately US$25 million.

Rutan has indicated that ideas about the project began as early as 1994 and the full-time development cycle time to the 2004 accomplishments was about three years. The vehicle first achieved supersonic flight on December 17, 2003, which was also the one-hundredth anniversary of the Wright Brothers' historic first powered flight. SpaceShipOne's first official spaceflight, known as flight 15P, was piloted by Mike Melvill. A few days before that flight, the Mojave Air and Space Port was the first commercial spaceport licensed in the United States. A few hours after that flight, Melvill became the first licensed U.S. commercial astronaut. The overall project name was "Tier One" which has evolved into Tier 1b with a goal of taking a successor ship's first passengers into space.

SpaceShipOne's official model designation is Scaled Composites Model 316.

=== SpaceShipTwo ===
The Scaled Composites Model 339 SpaceShipTwo (SS2) was an air-launched suborbital spaceplane type designed for space tourism. It was manufactured by The Spaceship Company, a California-based company owned by Virgin Galactic.

SpaceShipTwo was carried to its launch altitude by a White Knight Two aircraft, before being released to fly on into the upper atmosphere, powered by its rocket engine. It then glided back to Earth and performed a conventional runway landing. The spaceship was officially unveiled to the public on 7 December 2009 at the Mojave Air and Space Port in California. On 29 April 2013, after nearly three years of unpowered testing, the first one constructed successfully performed its first powered test flight.

Virgin Galactic planned to operate a fleet of five SpaceShipTwo spaceplanes in a private passenger-carrying service. Virgin Galactic took bookings for many years, with a suborbital flight ticket price rising quite heavily throughout the years. The spaceplane was also used to carry scientific payloads for NASA and other organizations.

==== VSS Enterprise ====
VSS Enterprise (tail number: N339SS) was the first SpaceShipTwo (SS2) spaceplane, built by Scaled Composites for Virgin Galactic. As of 2004, it was planned to be the first of five commercial suborbital SS2 spacecraft planned by Virgin Galactic. It was also the first ship of the Scaled Composites Model 339 SpaceShipTwo class, based on upscaling the design of the record-breaking SpaceShipOne.

The VSS Enterprise's name was an acknowledgement of the USS Enterprise from the Star Trek television series. The spaceplane also shared its name with NASA's prototype Space Shuttle orbiter, as well as the aircraft carrier USS Enterprise. It was rolled out on 7 December 2009.

SpaceShipTwo made its first powered flight in April 2013. Richard Branson said it "couldn't have gone more smoothly".

On 31 October 2014, during a test flight, the first SpaceShipTwo VSS Enterprise broke up in flight and crashed in the Mojave desert. A preliminary investigation suggested that the craft's descent device deployed too early. One pilot, Michael Alsbury, was killed; the other was treated for a serious shoulder injury after parachuting from the stricken spacecraft.

==== VSS Unity ====
VSS Unity (Virgin Space Ship Unity, Registration: N202VG), previously referred to as VSS Voyager, was a SpaceShipTwo-class suborbital rocket-powered crewed spaceplane. It was the second SpaceShipTwo-spacecraft to be built and was used as part of the Virgin Galactic fleet.

VSS Unity was unveiled on 19 February 2016. The spacecraft completed ground-based system integration testing in September 2016, after which the vehicle flew its first test flight also in September 2016. Its first flight to space (above 50 miles altitude), VSS Unity VP03, took place on 13 December 2018. It flew its final test flight (that is, final flight with only Virgin Galactic personnel onboard), Unity 25, on 25 May 2023. It flew its first operational flight (that is, flight carrying passengers that were not Virgin Galactic employees), Galactic 01, on 29 June 2023. It flew its last flight, Galactic 07, on 8 June 2024, after which it was retired.

=== SpaceShipThree ===
SpaceShip III (SS3, also with Roman numeral III; formerly SpaceShipThree) is an upcoming class of spaceplanes by Virgin Galactic to follow SpaceShipTwo. It was first teased on the Virgin Galactic Twitter account on 25 February 2021 announcing the rollout of the first SpaceShip III plane on 30 March 2021.

== Launch Statistics ==
=== Rocket ===
- SpaceShipOne
- SpaceShipTwo (VSS Enterprise)
- SpaceShipTwo (VSS Unity)

=== Outcome ===
- Success
- Failure

=== Flight type ===
- Glide flight
- Captive carry flight
- Cold flow flight
- Powered flight

== Flights ==
=== SpaceShipTwo ===
==== VSS Enterprise flights ====
===== Legend =====
Code	Detail
GFxx	Glide Flight
CCxx	Captive Carry Flight
CFxx	Cold Flow Flight
PFxx	Powered Flight
Fxx	Feathering deployed

===== Flights =====
Flight designation	Date	Duration	Maximum altitude	Top speed	Pilot / co-pilot	Notes
41 / GF01	10 October 2010	13 min	46,000 feet (14,000 m)	180 knots (210 mph; 330 km/h) EAS 2 g	Siebold / Alsbury	
44 / GF02	28 October 2010	10 min, 51 sec		230 knots (260 mph; 430 km/h) EAS 3 g	Stucky / Alsbury	
45 / GF03	17 November 2010	11 min, 39 sec		246 knots (283 mph; 456 km/h) EAS 3.5 g	Siebold / Nichols	
47 / GF04	13 January 2011	11 min, 34 sec		250 knots (290 mph; 460 km/h) EAS 3.8 g	Stucky / Nichols	
56 / GF05	22 April 2011	14 min, 31 sec			Siebold / Shane	
57 / GF06	27 April 2011	16 min, 7 sec			Stucky / Alsbury	
58 / GF07	4 May 2011	11 min, 5 sec	51,500 feet (15,700 m)	15,500 feet per minute (4,700 m/min)	Siebold / Nichols	F01
59 / GF08	10 May 2011	13 min, 2 sec			Stucky / Shane	
60 / GF09	19 May 2011	11 min, 32 sec			Siebold / Binnie	
61 / GF10	25 May 2011	10 min, 14 sec	Above 50,000 feet (15,000 m)		Stucky / Binnie	F02
62 / (CC12)	9 June 2011				Siebold / Shane	Release failure during flight intended as GF11
64 / GF11	14 June 2011	13 min, 18 sec			Siebold / Shane	
65 / GF12	15 June 2011	10 min, 32 sec			Stucky / Nichols	
66 / GF13	21 June 2011	8 min, 55 sec			Siebold / Nichols	
67 / GF14	23 June 2011	7 min, 33 sec			Stucky / Nichols	
68 / GF15	27 June 2011	7 min, 39 sec			Siebold / Binnie	
73 / GF16	29 September 2011	7 min, 15 sec			Stucky / Nichols / Persall	F03
87 / GF17	26 June 2012	11 min, 22 sec			Siebold / Alsbury	
88 / GF18	29 June 2012	13 min			Stucky / Mackay	
90 / GF19	18 July 2012	10 min, 39 sec			Siebold / Nichols	
91 / GF20	2 August 2012	8 min			Stucky / Nichols	F04
92 / GF21	7 August 2012	9 min, 52 sec			Siebold / Colmer	F05
93 / GF22	11 August 2012	8 min, 2 sec			Stucky / Binnie	
109 / GF23	19 December 2012	13 min, 24 sec			Stucky / Alsbury	
113 / GF24	3 April 2013	9 min			Stucky / Nichols	F06
114 / CF01	12 April 2013	10 min, 48 sec			Stucky / Alsbury	
115 / PF01	29 April 2013	13 min	56,000 feet (17,000 m)	Mach 1.22	Stucky / Alsbury	
130 / GF25	25 July 2013	11 min, 52 sec			Stucky / Mackay	
131 / GF26	8 August 2013	10 min			Stucky / Mackay	F07
132 / PF02	5 September 2013	14 min	69,000 feet (21,000 m)	Mach 1.43	Stucky / Nichols	F08
141 / GF27	11 December 2013.	11 min			Stucky / Masucci	
147 / PF03	10 January 2014	12 min, 43 sec	72,000 feet (22,000 m)	Mach 1.4	Mackay / Stucky	F09
149 / GF28	17 January 2014	14 min, 12 sec			Siebold / Sturckow	
156 / GF29	29 July 2014	12 min			Masucci / Siebold	
164 / CF02	28 August 2014	13 min			Siebold / Alsbury	
170 / GF30	7 October 2014	10 min, 30 sec			Siebold / Sturckow	F10
?? / PF04	31 October 2014	0 min, 13 sec	roughly 50,000 feet (15,000 m)	? (at least Mach 0.92)	Siebold / Alsbury	Unintended feathering destroys vehicle in-flight

==== VSS Unity flights ====
===== Legend =====
Code	Detail
GFxx	Glide Flight
CCxx	Captive Carry Flight
CFxx	Cold Flow Flight
PFxx	Powered Flight
Fxx	Feathering deployed

===== Flights =====
Flight designation	Date	Duration	Maximum altitude	Top speed	Pilot / co-pilot / passengers	Notes
01 / CC01	8 September 2016		15.2 km (50,000 ft)		Stucky / Mackay	
02 / CC02	1 November 2016					Strong winds, no release during flight intended as GF01
03 / CC03	3 November 2016					Strong winds, no release during second attempt at GF01
04 / CC04	30 November 2016					Test of minor modifications
05 / GF01	3 December 2016	10 minutes	16.8 km (55,000 ft)	Mach 0.6	Stucky / Mackay	First Glide Flight
06 / GF02	22 December 2016				Stucky / Mackay	
07 / GF03	24 February 2017				Sturckow / Mackay	3rd Glide Flight
08 / GF04	1 May 2017				Stucky / Masucci	F01
09 / CF01	1 June 2017				Mackay / Sturckow	
10 / GF06	4 August 2017				Mackay / Sturckow	First flight with major propulsion components aboard.
11 / GF07	11 January 2018			Mach 0.9	Stucky / Masucci	
12 / PF01	5 April 2018		25.7 km (84,300 ft)	Mach 1.87	Stucky / Mackay	F02
13 / PF02	29 May 2018		34.9 km (114,501 ft)	Mach 1.9	Mackay / Stucky	Test of changed center of gravity as passenger seats carried for first time. F03
14 / PF03	26 July 2018		52.1 km (170,800 ft)	Mach 2.47	Mackay / Masucci	Reached Mesosphere for first time.
15 / VP-03	13 December 2018		82.7 km (271,330 ft)	Mach 2.9	Stucky / Sturckow	Reached outer space for first time according to the US definition of the space border.
16 / VF-01	22 February 2019		89.9 km (295,007 ft)	Mach 3.04	Mackay / Masucci / Moses	Carried third crew member (1 in the passenger cabin) for the first time
17 / GF08	1 May 2020		15.24 km (50,000 ft)	Mach 0.7	Mackay / Sturckow	First flight from New Mexico
18 / GF09	25 June 2020		15.54 km (51,000 ft)	Mach 0.85	Stucky / Masucci	
19	12 December 2020				Mackay / Sturckow	First attempted crewed spaceflight from New Mexico, aborted due to computer malfunction, engine ignited and automatically turned off.
21 / VF-03	22 May 2021		89.23 km (55.45 mi)		Mackay / Sturckow	First crewed spaceflight (above 50 miles) from New Mexico
22	11 July 2021		86.1 km (53.5 mi)		Mackay / Masucci / Sirisha Bandla, Colin Bennett, Beth Moses, Richard Branson	First fully crewed (Note: The SpaceShipTwo vehicles (like VSS Unity) were originally designed for 8 people, 6 passengers and 2 pilots, so whether this flight was fully-crewed is debatable. But it is true that at the time of this flight, only 6 seats (4 passengers, 2 pilots) were installed in VSS Unity, so in this sense this flight was fully-crewed. Also, no SpaceShipTwo vehicle, VSS Unity in particular, ever had more than 6 seats installed and never flew with more than 6 people (2 pilots, 4 passengers) onboard, so in this sense this flight was also fully-crewed.) flight included Richard Branson.
24 / GF10	26 April 2023	9 minutes	13.5 km (47,000 ft)		Sturckow / Pecile	
25	25 May 2023	14 minutes	87.2 km (54.2 mi)	Mach 2.94	Masucci / Sturckow / Moses / Mays / Gilbert / Huie	
Galactic 01	29 June 2023	13:50 minutes	85.1 km (52.9 mi)	Mach 2.88	Masucci / Pecile / Villadei / Carlucci / Pandolfi / Bennett	First VSS Unity commercial service flight, carrying members of the Italian Air Force.
Galactic 02	10 August 2023	15:38 minutes	88.5 km (55.0 mi)	Mach 3.00	Sturckow / Latimer / Moses / Goodwin / Schahaff / Mayers	First VSS Unity flight carrying a private astronaut.
Galactic 03	8 September 2023	12:37 minutes	88.6 km (55.1 mi)	Mach 2.95	Masucci / Pecile / Moses / Baxter / Reynard / Nash	
Galactic 04	6 October 2023	14:23 minutes	87.4 km (54.3 mi)	Mach 2.95	Latimer / Sturckow / Moses / Rosano / Beattie / Salim	
Galactic 05	2 November 2023	14:20 minutes	87.2 km (54.2 mi)	Mach 2.96	Masucci / Latimer / Bennett / Stern / Gerardi / Maisonrouge	
Galactic 06	26 January 2024		88.8 km (55.2 mi)	Mach 2.98	Sturckow / Pecile / Borozdina / Vaughn / Haider / Kornswiet	
Galactic 07	8 June 2024		87.5 km (54.4 mi)	Mach 2.96	Pecile / Janjua / Atasever/ Manenti /Pergament / Sadhwani	Final powered flight
33 / GF11	27 May 2026				Masucci / Alix	Return to flight, training glide flight
34 / GF12	16 September 2026				Sturckow / Edgell	Training glide flight
35 / GF13	7 October 2026				Janjua / Pecile	Training glide flight
