= Air launch =

Aircraft launch from a mother ship

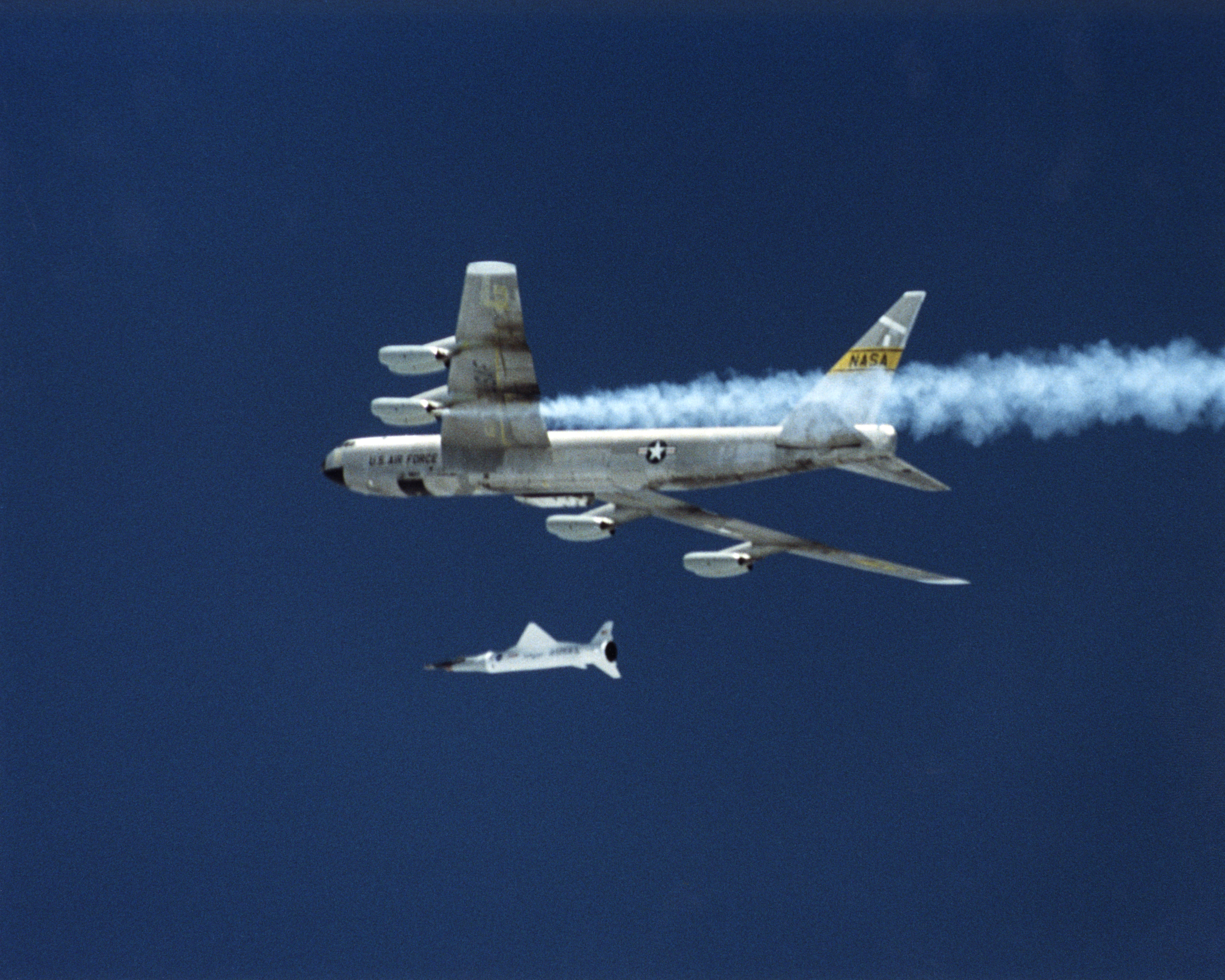
A Boeing X-43 being air launched from under the wing of a B-52 Stratofortress.

Air launching is the practice of releasing a rocket, missile, parasite aircraft or other aircraft payload from a mother ship or launch aircraft. The payload craft or missile is often tucked under the wing of the larger mother ship and then "dropped" while in flight. It may also be stored within a bomb bay, beneath the main fuselage or even on the back of the carrier aircraft, as in the case of the D-21 drone. Air launching provides several advantages over ground launching, giving the smaller craft an altitude and range boost, while saving it the weight of the fuel and equipment needed to take off on its own.

== History ==
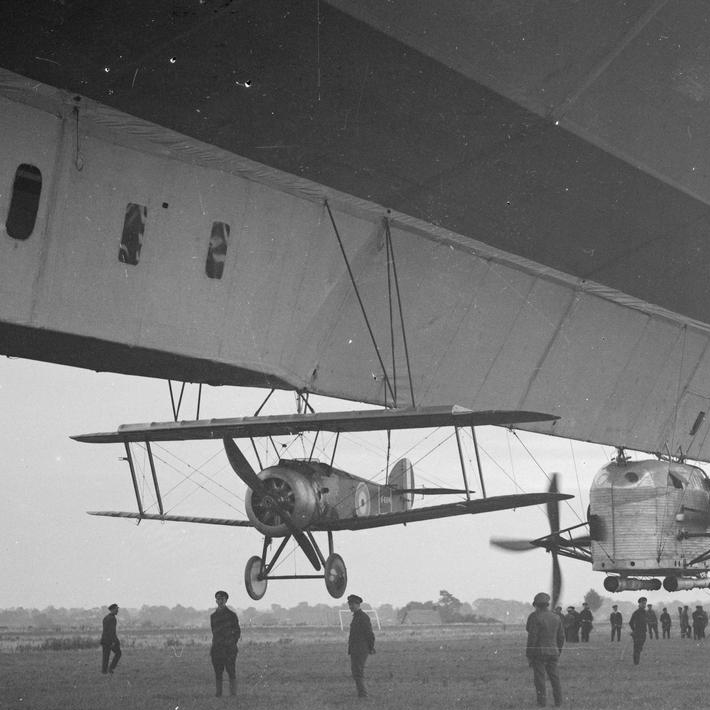
A Sopwith Camel secured beneath the British HM Airship 23r.

One of the earliest uses of air launching used an airship as a carrier and docking station for biplane parasite fighters. These planes would connect to their mothership through a trapeze-like rig, mounted to the top of the upper wing, that attached to a hook dangling from the bottom of the dirigible above. Fighters could be both launched and retrieved this way, giving the airship the speed and striking power of fixed-wing craft, while giving the fighters the range and lingering time of an airship. With advances in airplane technology, especially in range, the value of a dirigible mothership was reduced and the concept became obsolete.

The parasite fighter concept was later revived several times, in an attempt to solve the problem of how to protect bombers from fighter attack. The Convair B-36 was used to air launch several prototype fighters for defense, but none offered performance that could match ground-launched fighters. Even the largest bomber ever mass-produced was too small a mothership for the jet age. Docking also presented its own plethora of problems.

Air launch is the standard way to launch air-to-surface missiles and air-to-air missiles and is mainly used for rocket-powered craft, allowing them to conserve their fuel until lifted to altitude by a larger aircraft. The B-29, B-50, and B-52 have all served in the carrier role for research programs such as the Bell X-1 and X-15.

In the 1960s the SR-71 aircraft was used to launch the Lockheed D-21/M-21 drone to speeds of up to Mach 3. However, this added a degree of difficulty due to the shock wave pattern around an aircraft at supersonic speeds. After three successful tests, the fourth resulted in a collision with the carrier aircraft, in which both craft were destroyed and one crew member drowned. The project was subsequently abandoned.

During the development of the Space Shuttle orbiter in the 1970s, NASA used two modified Boeing 747 airliners, known as the Shuttle Carrier Aircraft, to launch the Space Shuttle Enterprise, a crewed atmospheric test vehicle used to test the orbiter's approach and landing capabilities. These aircraft were subsequently used throughout the Space Shuttle Program to transport the shuttles across long distances.

The Pegasus launch vehicle became the first air-launched orbital rocket when it was launched on April 5, 1990 by the private company Orbital Sciences Corporation (now a part of Northrop Grumman), from a NASA-owned B-52 Stratofortress. It has flown more than 40 times since, launched mostly from the company's own Lockheed L-1011 known as Stargazer. Orbital Sciences was developing the Pegasus II launcher that would have dropped from the purpose-built Scaled Composites Stratolaunch. Pegasus's capacity to low Earth orbit was projected to be 13,500 pounds (6,100 kg).

In the early 2000s, the B-52 was used to launch the X-43 hypersonic testbed aircraft. Recently, the air launch method has gained popularity with commercial launch providers. The Ansari X-Prize $10 million purse was won by a team led by Burt Rutan and Paul Allen for the successful launch of SpaceShipOne twice in a row in two weeks, which were the criteria.

In 2010, the SpaceShipTwo launch vehicle began launching. It was the successor the SpaceShipOne launch vehicle, which was retired in 2004. The first SpaceShipTwo aircraft, the VSS Enterprise flew 35 flights successfully from 2010 to 2014. However, on 31 October 2014, the vehicle was destroyed in-flight after an unintentional feathering. Michael Alsbury was killed and Peter Siebold was severely injured. In 2016, another ship, the VSS Unity conducted it's maiden flight, which went smoothly. The VSS Unity conducted 20 test flights. The last one reached space, but without commercial crew onboard. On 11 July 2021, SpaceShipTwo launched 6 people to space. 2 were pilots and the rest tourists. Virgin Galactic repeatedly announced plans to refly the SpaceShipTwo. These plans have been delayed by more than a year and a half. It is currently expected to fly no earlier than the second quarter of 2023.

In 2021, Virgin Galactic announced plans for a SpaceShipThree. This would provide point-to-point transportation across the world. Two ships, the VSS Imagine and VSS Inspire are planned. In 2022, Virgin Galactic announced plans for the new Delta-class launch vehicle. This would be able to reach orbit. It is expected to launch in 2026.

== See also ==
- Composite aircraft
  - Parasite aircraft
- Mother ship
- Pegasus (rocket)
- Air launch to orbit
- Airborne aircraft carrier
- Rocket sled launch
- Megascale engineering
- SpaceShipOne
- SpaceShipTwo
- LauncherOne
- List of Virgin Galactic launches
