= VSS Unity VP-03 =

First SpaceShipTwo spaceflight

VP-03
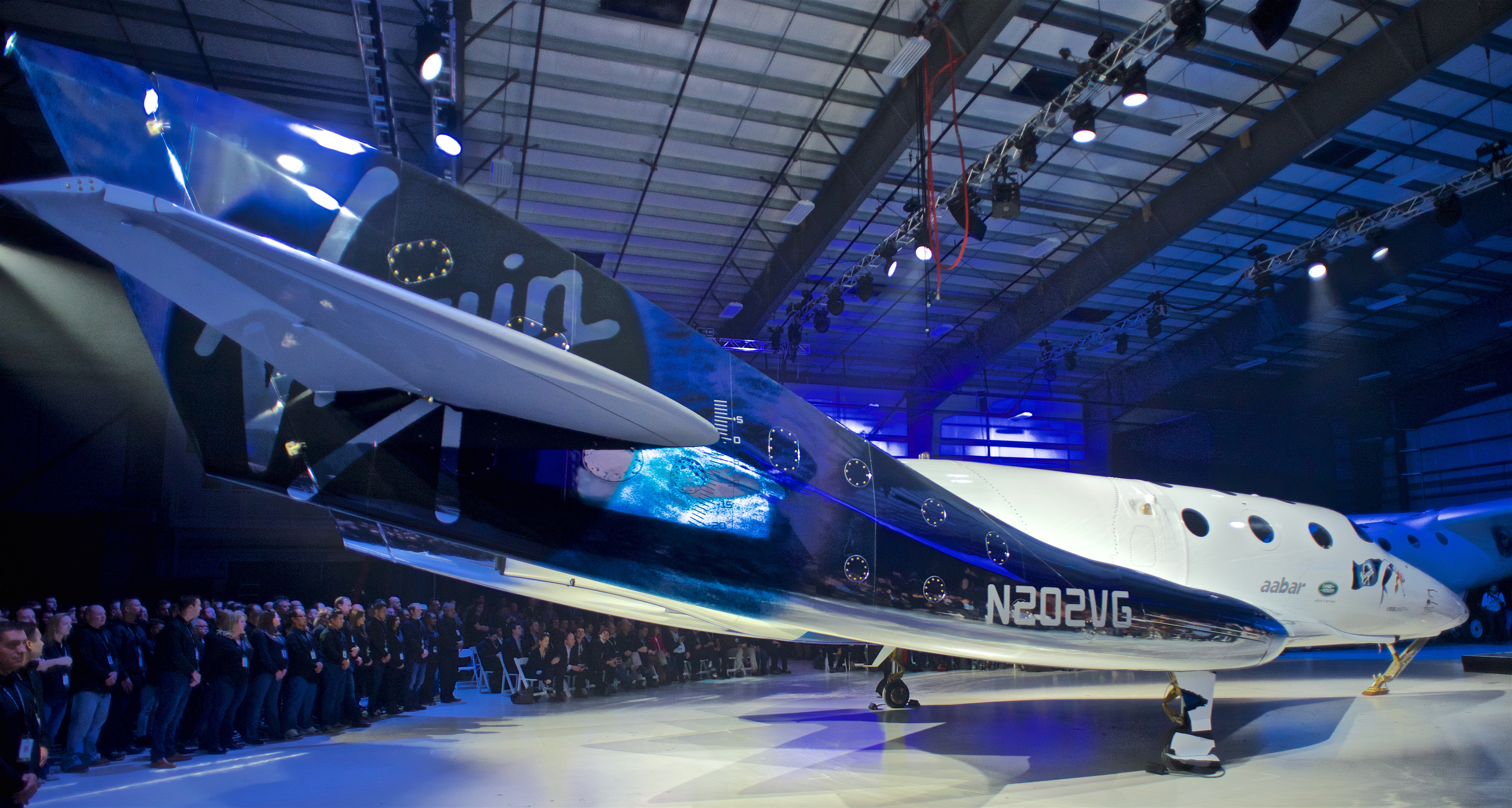
- VSS Unity in February 2016
- Mission type: Crewed suborbital spaceflight
- Operator: Virgin Galactic
- Apogee: 82.7 kilometres (51.4 miles)

Spacecraft properties
- Spacecraft: VSS Unity
- Spacecraft type: SpaceShipTwo
- Manufacturer: The Spaceship Company

Crew
- Members: Mark Stucky; Frederick Sturckow

Start of mission
- Launch date: 13 December 2018
- Launch site: Mojave Runway 30
- Deployed from: VMS Eve

End of mission
- Landing date: 13 December 2018
- Landing site: Mojave Runway 30

VP-03 (also referred to in some sources as PF04) was a sub-orbital spaceflight of the SpaceShipTwo-class VSS Unity which took place on 13 December 2018, piloted by Mark P. Stucky and co-piloted by Frederick W. "CJ" Sturckow.

VSS Unity was carried aloft by the White Knight Two carrier plane before being released. The spacecraft reached an apogee of 82.7 km (51.4 mi); the flight satisfied the United States definition of spaceflight (50 mi (80.47 km)) but fell short of the Kármán line (100 km (62.14 mi)), the Fédération Aéronautique Internationale definition. The flight was operated by Virgin Galactic, a private company led by Richard Branson who conducted a space tourism flight on 11 July 2021. It was the first crewed spaceflight from U.S. soil since the Space Shuttle mission STS-135 in 2011.

== Crew ==
Position	Astronaut
Commander	(United States) Mark P. Stucky; Only spaceflight
Pilot	(United States) Frederick "CJ" Sturckow; Fifth spaceflight

Flights are currently only by U.S. Convention.

== Background ==
During the 20th century, human spaceflight was conducted exclusively by countries and government agencies, such as NASA. This began to change during the early 21st century, as several private spaceflight companies either continued development, or were established. From 2000 to 2004, Blue Origin, SpaceX and Virgin Galactic were founded. In 2004, SpaceShipOne became the first private craft to carry humans into space. On three separate one-man sub-orbital flights, pilots Mike Melvill and Brian Binnie reached a maximum altitude above 100 kilometers, thereby crossing the Kármán line, the internationally recognized boundary of outer space. SpaceShipOne was carried into flight in a parasite configuration by White Knight, its mother ship, from which point it flew into space. SpaceShipOne was designed by Burt Rutan and manufactured by Scaled Composites, a company he had founded in 1982. In 2005, Rutan and Virgin Galactic founder Richard Branson co-founded The Spaceship Company, a separate manufacturing organization meant to supply Virgin Galactic with a fleet of spacecraft. The results were SpaceShipTwo and mother ship White Knight Two, also designed by Rutan. The first instances of each craft were dubbed the VSS Enterprise and the VMS Eve, respectively. The parasite aspect of both SpaceShipOne and SpaceShipTwo's flight profiles are shared with the North American X-15, an earlier spaceplane which also performed high-altitude and sub-orbital flights.

In May 2013, retired NASA astronaut and four-time Space Shuttle veteran Frederick "CJ" Sturckow joined Virgin Galactic as a test pilot. Sturckow had previously flown on STS-88, STS-105, STS-117 and STS-128 before entering spaceflight's private sector.

On 31 October 2014, the Enterprise was destroyed in a catastrophic breakup, killing its co-pilot Michael Alsbury and seriously injuring its lead pilot Peter Siebold. Following the disaster, the second SpaceShipTwo craft, VSS Unity, was completed in 2016, and began testing.

In January 2015, Scaled Composites test pilot Mark "Forger" Stucky was hired by Virgin Galactic as a test pilot. Stucky had been closely involved with the development of SpaceShipTwo during his tenure with Scaled. He also served for one year (2014–2015) as the president of the Society of Experimental Test Pilots.

== Flight ==
On 13 December 2018, at an altitude of 43,000 ft (13,000 m), the VMS Eve released the VSS Unity for its fourth powered test flight. Lead pilot Stucky and co-pilot Sturckow flew Unity at a maximum Mach of 2.9 to an altitude of 82.7 km (51.4 mi), thereby surpassing the 50 mi (80 km) limit used in the United States to denote the limit of space, but falling short of the Kármán line of 62 mi (100 km). Both craft landed safely afterwards. The flight was publicized online in various tweets by Virgin Galactic, Branson himself, and related personnel.

== Response ==
The Federal Aviation Administration congratulated Virgin Galactic and the pilots on their successful flight, and invited the team to Washington, D.C. for a ceremony to award the pilots astronaut wings.

Virgin Galactic and its personnel were also congratulated on Twitter by U.S. Vice President Mike Pence, (Note: "Congrats @virgingalactic for sending your first astronauts to space today aboard SpaceShipTwo VSS Unity – the 1st crewed flight to launch from US soil in over 7 years!") NASA administrator Jim Bridenstine, (Note: "Congratulations to @virgingalactic on the first human spaceflight to be launched from American soil since the retirement of the Space Shuttle!") Canadian astronaut Chris Hadfield, (Note: "Congratulations CJ, Forger, Sir Richard and everyone @virgingalactic! The sonic boom of a new door opening.") and British astronaut Tim Peake. (Note: "Congratulations to the entire @virgingalactic team on a ground-breaking flight into space") On the other hand, Virgin Galactic were sharply criticized following the flight by Australian-American astronaut Andy Thomas, who characterized their sub-orbital program as "a high-altitude aeroplane flight and a dangerous one at that".

== See also ==
- Mercury-Redstone 3
- Mercury-Redstone 4
- North American X-15
- Soyuz MS-10
- Sub-orbital spaceflight
