= Doug Shane =

American test pilot

Douglas B. Shane
- Education: University of Kansas
- Occupations: Executive, Test Pilot
- Space career

Test pilot
- Selection: SpaceShipOne 2003
- Missions: None

Douglas Bennett Shane is President of The Spaceship Company, as well as an American test pilot who has trained as a commercial astronaut. He was a member of the Scaled Composites astronaut team and one of the test pilots for SpaceShipOne, the experimental spaceplane developed by Scaled Composites. Shane worked as the operations director on the SpaceShipOne project in addition to being one of the program pilots, and later served as President of Scaled Composites from 2008 through early 2013.

== Biography ==
In 1982, Shane received a Bachelor of Science degree in aerospace engineering from the University of Kansas.

Shane built a Long-Ez he called the "Shane Runabout".

=== Scaled Composites ===
In 1982, Shane joined Scaled Composites, in Mojave, California, as a test pilot and founding member. After 1989, he was responsible for business development, contracts, and proposals, as well as the company's flight test operations.

In 1997, Shane received the Iven C. Kincheloe Award from the Society of Experimental Test Pilots for his flight test work on the Williams V-Jet II and Vision Aire Vantage. He is a past President of the Society of Experimental Test Pilots.

In 2004, as director of flight operations, Shane supervised the Ansari X Prize qualification flights from the control room. Although he was one of the four qualified pilots for SpaceShipOne, Shane did not fly any of the flights himself.

In June 2008, Shane was appointed president of Scaled Composites, taking over this role from previous president and company founder Burt Rutan. He stayed in this position for five years, from 2008 through early 2013.

=== The Spaceship Company ===
In June 2013, Shane joined The Spaceship Company (TSC) to become executive VP and general manager, ending a 31-year career with Scaled Composites, including five as president. He was promoted to president of TSC in July 2014.

== See also ==
- Scaled Composites
- SpaceShipOne
- The Spaceship Company
