= VSS Enterprise =

SpaceShipTwo (SS2) spaceplane

VSS Enterprise (N339SS)
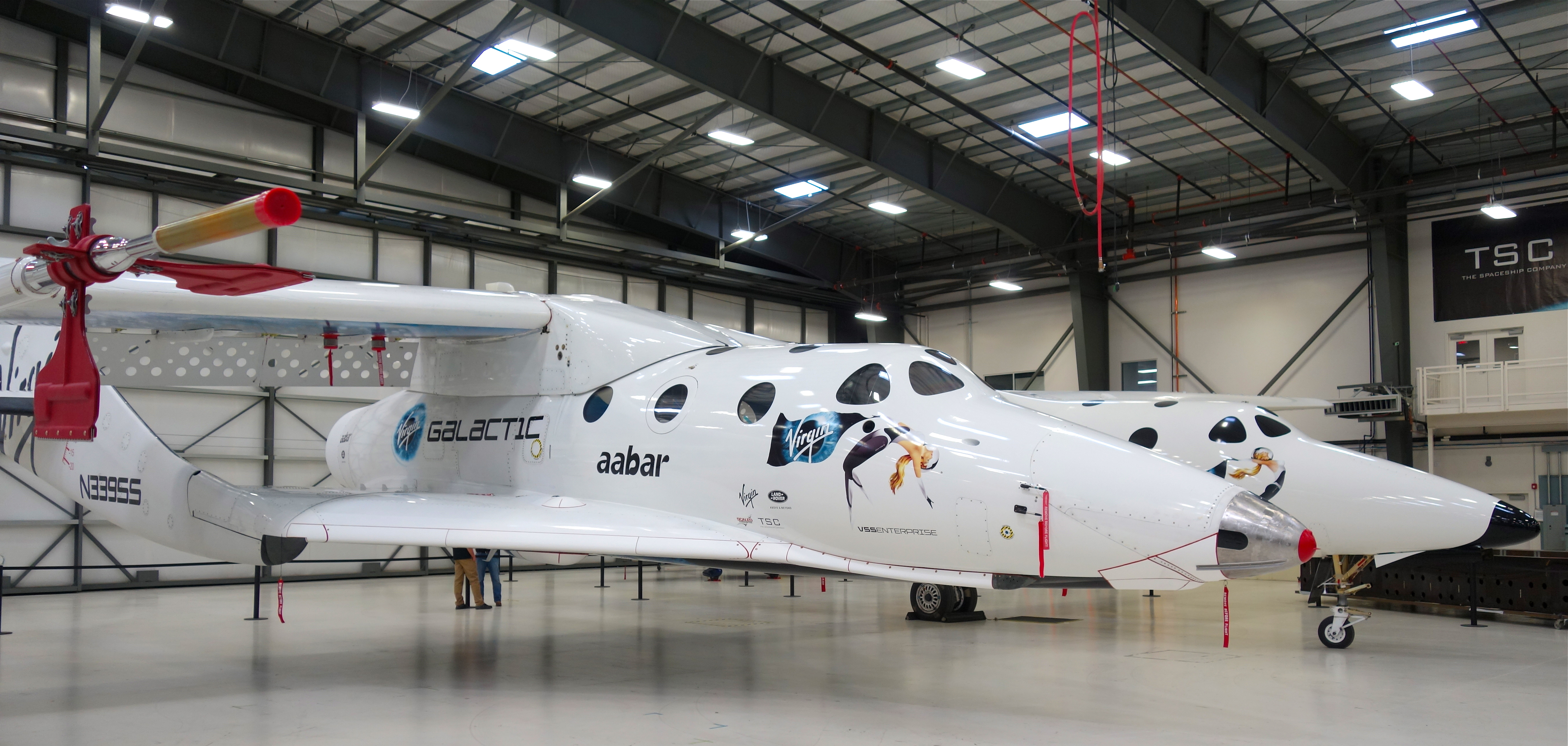
- VSS Enterprise, the first SpaceShipTwo spaceplane, attached to its carrier aircraft WhiteKnightTwo VMS Eve

General information
- Type: Scaled Composites Model 339 SpaceShipTwo
- Manufacturer: Scaled Composites
- Status: Destroyed
- Owners: Virgin Galactic
- Construction number: 1
- Registration: N339SS

History
- First flight: 10 October 2010 (crewed gliding flight) 29 April 2013 (powered flight)
- Fate: Crashed; 31 October 2014

VSS Enterprise (tail number: N339SS) was the first SpaceShipTwo (SS2) spaceplane, built by Scaled Composites for Virgin Galactic. It had been planned to be the first of five commercial suborbital SS2 spacecraft planned by Virgin Galactic, but only one other was ever built.

It was also the first ship of the Scaled Composites Model 339 SpaceShipTwo class, based on upscaling the design of record-breaking SpaceShipOne.

The VSS Enterprise's name was an acknowledgement of the USS Enterprise from the Star Trek television series. The spaceplane also shared its name with NASA's prototype Space Shuttle orbiter, as well as the aircraft carrier USS Enterprise. It was rolled out on 7 December 2009.

SpaceShipTwo made its first powered flight in April 2013. Richard Branson said it "couldn't have gone more smoothly".

Enterprise was destroyed during a powered test flight on 31 October 2014, killing one pilot, Michael Alsbury, and seriously injuring another, Peter Siebold. This was the first spacecraft-related accident in which part, but not all, of the crew survived. An investigation revealed the accident was caused by premature deployment of the "feathering" system, the ship's descent device; the NTSB also faulted the spacecraft's design for lacking fail-safe mechanisms that could have deterred or prevented early deployment.

== Flight test program ==
Initial projections by Virgin Galactic in 2008 called for test flights to begin in late 2009 and commercial service to start in 2011. This schedule was not achieved, with captive carry and glide flight tests beginning in 2010, and the first test flight under rocket power in 2013.

In October 2009, Virgin Galactic CEO Will Whitehorn outlined the flight test program for SpaceShipTwo. The test program includes seven phases:

1. Vehicle ground testing
2. Captive carry under White Knight Two
3. Unpowered glide testing
4. Subsonic testing with only a brief firing of the rocket
5. Supersonic atmospheric testing
6. Full flight into suborbital space
7. Execute a detailed and lengthy appraisal process with the FAA/AST to demonstrate the system's robustness and eventually obtain a commercial launch license to begin commercial operations.

On 22 March 2010, the SpaceShipTwo vehicle VSS Enterprise underwent a captive carry test flight, with the parent White Knight Two aircraft, VMS Eve, performing a short flight while carrying the Enterprise. A second test flight was made on 16 May 2010, reaching SS2's launch altitude (51,000 feet) and lasting nearly five hours, in order to facilitate "cold soak" testing of SS2's avionics and pressurization system. Thereafter, "a simulated spaceship descent/glide mission was made from [launch] altitude." Between these two flights, the SpaceShipTwo airframe was modified by the addition of two interior fins, with one fin being added to the inside (rocket-side) of each of the craft's twin vertical stabilizers.

On 15 July 2010, VSS Enterprise made its first crewed flight. The craft remained attached to VMS Eve as planned, and underwent a series of combined vehicle systems tests. The flight lasted a total of 6 hours and 21 minutes. A second, similar crewed flight of VSS Enterprise and VMS Eve was carried out on 30 September 2010, lasting approximately 5 hours. Among the objectives of these flights was the improvement of pilot proficiency, and the results of the flights were deemed to show that the systems were capable of supporting future glide missions.

On 10 October 2010, VSS Enterprise made its first crewed gliding test flight. It was released from VMS Eve at 45,000 ft (13,700 metres) and glided to a safe landing at the Mojave Air and Spaceport. A second gliding test flight took place on 28 October 2010 and a third on 17 November 2010. As of December 2010, Scaled reported that the flight test program was exceeding expectations. The fourth test flight took place on 13 January 2011, while the fifth and sixth glide flights occurred on 22 and 27 April 2011, respectively. Following this, the feathered reentry configuration was tested in flight on 4 May 2011, with weekly test flights continuing through the end of May. On 9 June 2011, SS2 failed to separate from White Knight Two during its 11th planned glide flight due to a technical problem. Testing resumed with five successful glide flights in June 2011.

In July 2011, after 15 successful glide flights, flight testing of SS2 was halted for two months while planned revisions to the spaceplane were made. Flight tests resumed in late September 2011, although the 16th glide flight – on 29 September – was marred by a brief loss of control aboard SS2, forcing the crew to utilise the feathered wing configuration to land safely. This test was followed by another hiatus, during which some of the spacecraft's engine components were installed. In June 2012, Scaled Composites received an FAA permit to conduct rocket-powered supersonic test flights. SpaceShipTwo flight tests resumed in June 2012.

In September 2012, Virgin Galactic announced that the unpowered subsonic glide flight test program was essentially complete. The company thereafter stated its intention to fit the hybrid rocket motor and control system to the vehicle, before resuming the glide flight test program with the rocket motor installed, in order to recharacterize the spacecraft's glide performance with slightly different weight distribution and aerodynamics. In October 2012, Scaled Composites installed key components of the rocket motor, and SpaceShipTwo performed its first glide flight with the engine installed in December 2012.

The spacecraft's first powered test flight took place on 29 April 2013, briefly driving SpaceShipTwo to a supersonic velocity. Richard Branson said it "couldn't have gone more smoothly".

On 5 September 2013, the second powered flight was made by the SpaceShipTwo. It broke the sound barrier, reached Mach 1.43, and climbed to 69,000 feet (21 km) over the Mojave Desert under rocket power and descended using its tilt-wing "feathering" maneuver. Space journalist Doug Messier reported that "the engine plume featured white smoke, not the black smoke seen on the April flight."

On 10 January 2014, the third powered flight climbed higher than the previous flights, testing a new coating on the tail boom and other systems.

=== List of test flights ===
===== Legend =====
Code	Detail
GFxx	Glide Flight
CCxx	Captive Carry Flight
CFxx	Cold Flow Flight
PFxx	Powered Flight
Fxx	Feathering deployed

===== Flights =====
Flight designation	Date	Duration	Maximum altitude	Top speed	Pilot / co-pilot	Notes
41 / GF01	10 October 2010	13 min	46,000 feet (14,000 m)	180 knots (210 mph; 330 km/h) EAS 2 g	Siebold / Alsbury	
44 / GF02	28 October 2010	10 min, 51 sec		230 knots (260 mph; 430 km/h) EAS 3 g	Stucky / Alsbury	
45 / GF03	17 November 2010	11 min, 39 sec		246 knots (283 mph; 456 km/h) EAS 3.5 g	Siebold / Nichols	
47 / GF04	13 January 2011	11 min, 34 sec		250 knots (290 mph; 460 km/h) EAS 3.8 g	Stucky / Nichols	
56 / GF05	22 April 2011	14 min, 31 sec			Siebold / Shane	
57 / GF06	27 April 2011	16 min, 7 sec			Stucky / Alsbury	
58 / GF07	4 May 2011	11 min, 5 sec	51,500 feet (15,700 m)	15,500 feet per minute (4,700 m/min)	Siebold / Nichols	F01
59 / GF08	10 May 2011	13 min, 2 sec			Stucky / Shane	
60 / GF09	19 May 2011	11 min, 32 sec			Siebold / Binnie	
61 / GF10	25 May 2011	10 min, 14 sec	Above 50,000 feet (15,000 m)		Stucky / Binnie	F02
62 / (CC12)	9 June 2011				Siebold / Shane	Release failure during flight intended as GF11
64 / GF11	14 June 2011	13 min, 18 sec			Siebold / Shane	
65 / GF12	15 June 2011	10 min, 32 sec			Stucky / Nichols	
66 / GF13	21 June 2011	8 min, 55 sec			Siebold / Nichols	
67 / GF14	23 June 2011	7 min, 33 sec			Stucky / Nichols	
68 / GF15	27 June 2011	7 min, 39 sec			Siebold / Binnie	
73 / GF16	29 September 2011	7 min, 15 sec			Stucky / Nichols / Persall	F03
87 / GF17	26 June 2012	11 min, 22 sec			Siebold / Alsbury	
88 / GF18	29 June 2012	13 min			Stucky / Mackay	
90 / GF19	18 July 2012	10 min, 39 sec			Siebold / Nichols	
91 / GF20	2 August 2012	8 min			Stucky / Nichols	F04
92 / GF21	7 August 2012	9 min, 52 sec			Siebold / Colmer	F05
93 / GF22	11 August 2012	8 min, 2 sec			Stucky / Binnie	
109 / GF23	19 December 2012	13 min, 24 sec			Stucky / Alsbury	
113 / GF24	3 April 2013	9 min			Stucky / Nichols	F06
114 / CF01	12 April 2013	10 min, 48 sec			Stucky / Alsbury	
115 / PF01	29 April 2013	13 min	56,000 feet (17,000 m)	Mach 1.22	Stucky / Alsbury	
130 / GF25	25 July 2013	11 min, 52 sec			Stucky / Mackay	
131 / GF26	8 August 2013	10 min			Stucky / Mackay	F07
132 / PF02	5 September 2013	14 min	69,000 feet (21,000 m)	Mach 1.43	Stucky / Nichols	F08
141 / GF27	11 December 2013.	11 min			Stucky / Masucci	
147 / PF03	10 January 2014	12 min, 43 sec	72,000 feet (22,000 m)	Mach 1.4	Mackay / Stucky	F09
149 / GF28	17 January 2014	14 min, 12 sec			Siebold / Sturckow	
156 / GF29	29 July 2014	12 min			Masucci / Siebold	
164 / CF02	28 August 2014	13 min			Siebold / Alsbury	
170 / GF30	7 October 2014	10 min, 30 sec			Siebold / Sturckow	F10
?? / PF04	31 October 2014	0 min, 13 sec	roughly 50,000 feet (15,000 m)	? (at least Mach 0.92)	Siebold / Alsbury	Unintended feathering destroys vehicle in-flight

=== First commercial spacecraft accident ===
On 31 October 2014, Enterprise broke apart in flight during a powered test flight over California's Mojave Desert. The flight began smoothly, with Enterprise being dropped from its WhiteKnightTwo carrier and igniting its engine at an altitude of 50,000 feet (15,000 m). About 60 to 90 seconds into the flight, an "anomaly" was reported that resulted in destruction of the ship. The pilot in command, Peter Siebold, escaped from the craft and parachuted to safety; the copilot, Michael Alsbury, was killed in the crash.

The National Transportation Safety Board conducted an independent investigation into the accident. In July 2015, the NTSB released a report that cited inadequate design safeguards, poor pilot training, lack of rigorous federal oversight and a potentially anxious co-pilot without recent flight experience as important factors in the crash. The NTSB determined that the crash resulted from the co-pilot's premature deployment of the feathering mechanism, which is normally used to aid a safe descent. The NTSB also faulted the ship's designers for failing to protect against human error, noting that the spacecraft lacked fail-safe systems that would have prevented or deterred a premature deployment of the feathering mechanism. The NTSB recommended that the FAA establish human factors guidance specific to commercial spaceflight operators and create a more rigorous application process for experimental spaceflight permits.

== Image gallery ==
Virgin Galactic VSS Enterprise

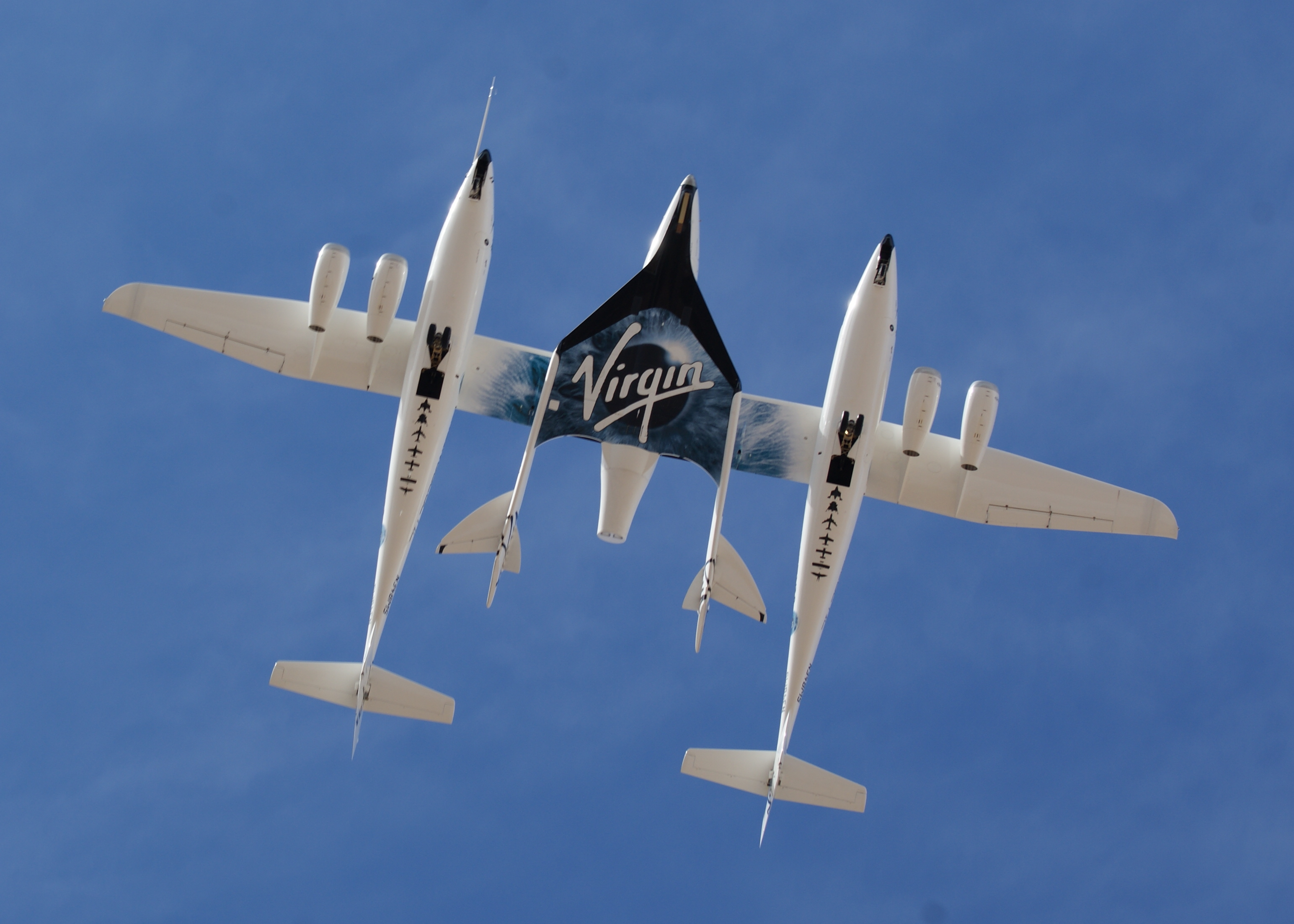
Enterprise in flight slung under VMS Eve

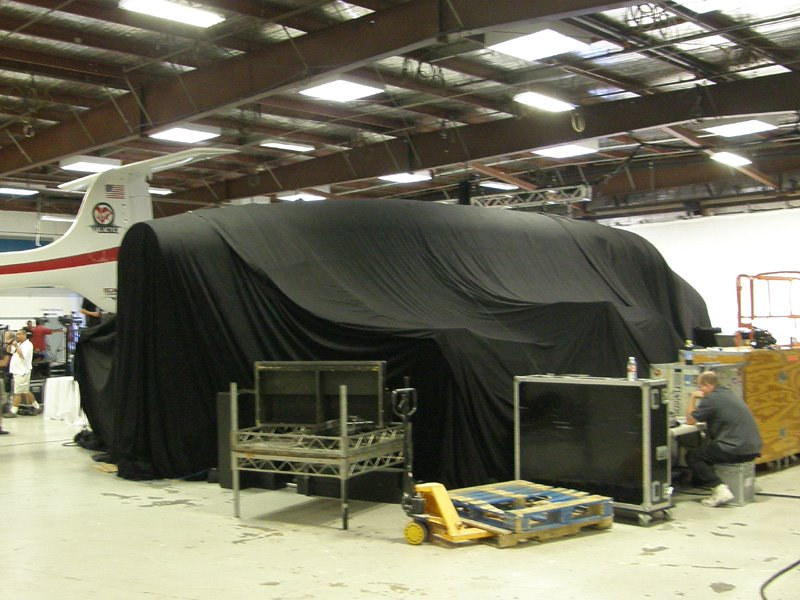
Enterprise under construction and under wraps in 2008

A 3-view of the SS2

== See also ==
- Burt Rutan
- Space tourism
- VSS Unity
- VMS Eve
