= VSS Enterprise crash =

2014 spacecraft accident in California

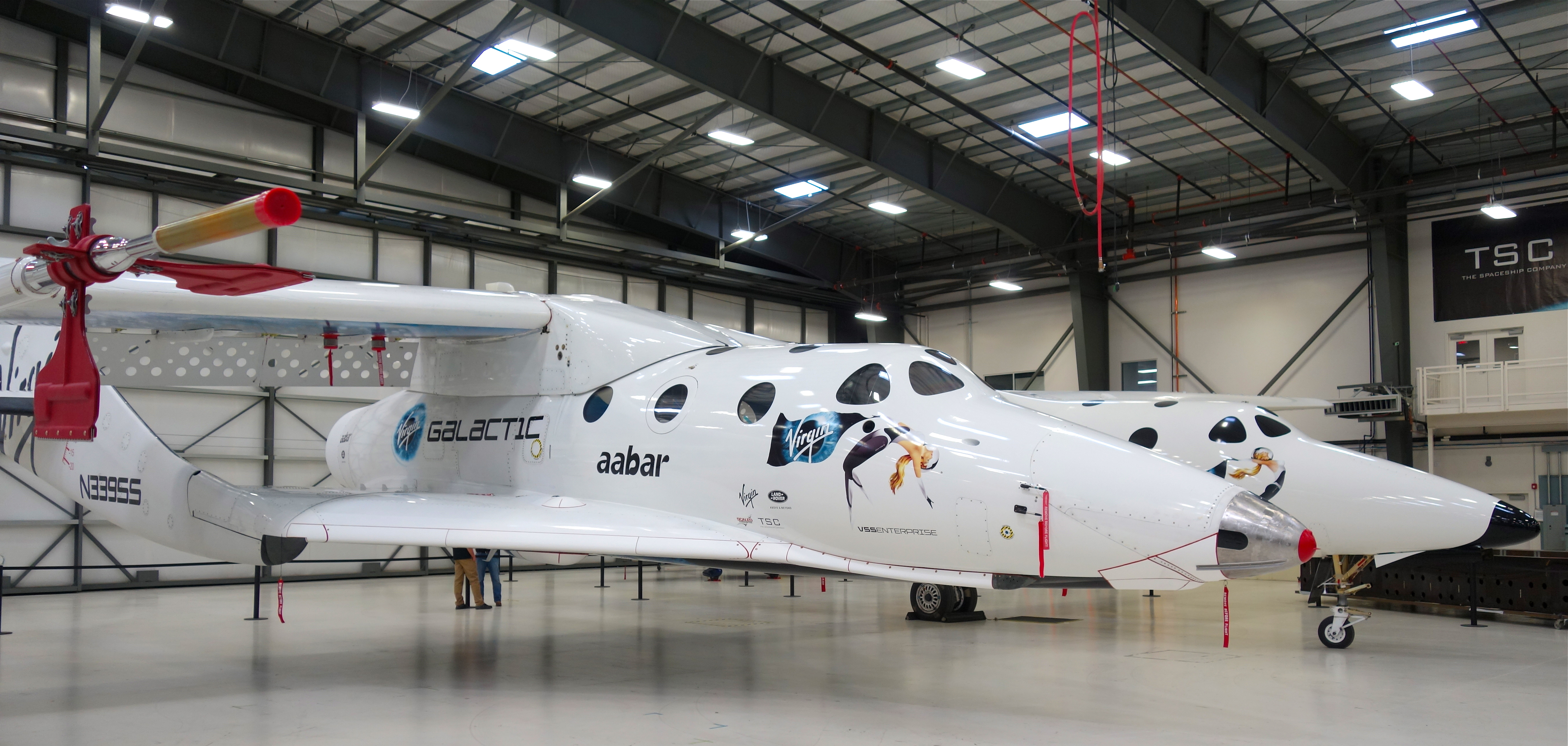
- N339SS, the VSS Enterprise involved in the accident, attached to its mothership, VMS Eve

Accident
- Date: October 31, 2014
- Summary: In-flight break-up caused by design flaw and pilot error
- Site: Mojave Desert, California, United States

Aircraft
- Aircraft type: Scaled Composites Model 339 SpaceShipTwo
- Aircraft name: VSS Enterprise
- Operator: Virgin Galactic
- Registration: N339SS
- Flight origin: Mojave Air and Space Port, California, United States
- Destination: Mojave Air and Space Port
- Occupants: 2
- Crew: 2
- Fatalities: 1
- Injuries: 1
- Survivors: 1

The VSS Enterprise crash occurred on October 31, 2014, when VSS Enterprise, a SpaceShipTwo experimental spaceflight test vehicle operated by Virgin Galactic, suffered a catastrophic in-flight breakup during a test flight and crashed in the Mojave Desert near Cantil, California. Co-pilot Michael Alsbury was killed and pilot Peter Siebold was seriously injured.

The National Transportation Safety Board later concluded that the breakup was caused by Alsbury's premature unlocking of the air brake device used for atmospheric re-entry. The NTSB said other important factors in the accident were inadequate design safeguards, poor pilot training and lack of rigorous oversight by the Federal Aviation Administration (FAA).

== Accident ==
Location of the crash site near Cantil, California

On the day of the accident, Enterprise was performing a test flight – powered flight 4 (PF04) – in which it was dropped from the WhiteKnightTwo carrier aircraft, VMS Eve, after taking off from the Mojave Air and Space Port. The test flight was the aircraft's first powered flight in nine months, and was to include the first flight testing of a new, more powerful and steadier-thrust hybrid rocket engine whose fuel grain was composed of nylon instead of rubber. The flight was the aircraft's 55th, and its 35th free flight. VSS Enterprise was crewed by pilot Peter Siebold and co-pilot Michael Alsbury.

According to the NTSB briefing, SpaceShipTwo (SS2) dropped from the mother ship as planned and fired its new hybrid rocket engine normally. About eleven seconds later, the space plane violently broke apart, substantially giving the appearance of an explosion, and creating a 35-mile-long (55-kilometer) debris field. Witnesses reported seeing a parachute before the aircraft crashed. Alsbury was killed in the crash. Siebold survived with serious injuries and was transported to Antelope Valley Hospital in nearby Lancaster. The carrier aircraft, VMS Eve, landed safely.

There was initial conjecture from some industry experts that the new rocket engine was at fault, but this was quickly disproved when the craft's engine and propellant tanks were recovered intact; indicating there was no explosion due to either the solid (nylon-based) or liquid (nitrous oxide) components of the hybrid engine.

A preliminary investigation and cockpit video subsequently indicated that the feathering system, the ship's air-braking descent device, deployed too early. Two seconds later, while still under rocket propulsion, the craft disintegrated. The feathering system requires two levers to operate. The system was unlocked by Michael Alsbury, but the feathering control was not moved, indicating an uncommanded feathering as "that action alone should not have been enough to pivot the tails upright" according to the NTSB. The feathering system had been deliberately deployed at supersonic speeds during earlier powered flight tests of SS2, but previous activation either occurred in thinner air at higher altitudes, or at much lower speeds than the flight on October 31.

Regarding the possibility of pilot error being the proximate cause of the crash, acting NTSB chairman Christopher Hart said: "We are not ruling anything out. We are looking at all of these issues to determine what was the root cause of this mishap … We are looking at a number of possibilities, including that possibility (of pilot error)."

The incident resulted in the first fatality on a spacecraft in flight since the Space Shuttle Columbia disaster in 2003. The survival of pilot Peter Siebold also marks the first time in history that anyone has survived the destruction of a spacecraft during a flight when others on board have died. Investigators were initially puzzled about how Siebold managed to get out of the rocket plane and parachute to the ground from an altitude of roughly 50,000 feet (15,000 meters), where the atmosphere is virtually devoid of oxygen. On November 7, Siebold told investigators that the aircraft broke up around him. He was still strapped into his seat. He released the straps and his parachute later deployed automatically. Siebold was not wearing a pressure suit.

== Aircraft ==
The vehicle in the accident, VSS Enterprise, registration N339SS, was the sole Scaled Composites Model 339 SpaceShipTwo test vehicle. It was the first of the five SpaceShipTwo craft planned by Virgin Galactic. Since October 2010, VSS Enterprise had flown 20 captive flights while remaining attached to its WhiteKnightTwo carrier aircraft, 31 unpowered glide-to-landing tests, and three rocket-powered test flights. There were several performance issues during the ship engine's development in 2012 and 2013.

A rocket-powered test flight of SpaceShipTwo took place on April 29, 2013, with an engine burn of 16 seconds duration. The brief flight began at an altitude of 47,000 feet (14,000 m), and reached a maximum altitude of 55,000 feet (17,000 m) and a speed of Mach 1.2 (920 mph or 1,480 km/h).

A second SS2 vehicle, VSS Unity, was rolled out in February 2016.

== Investigation ==
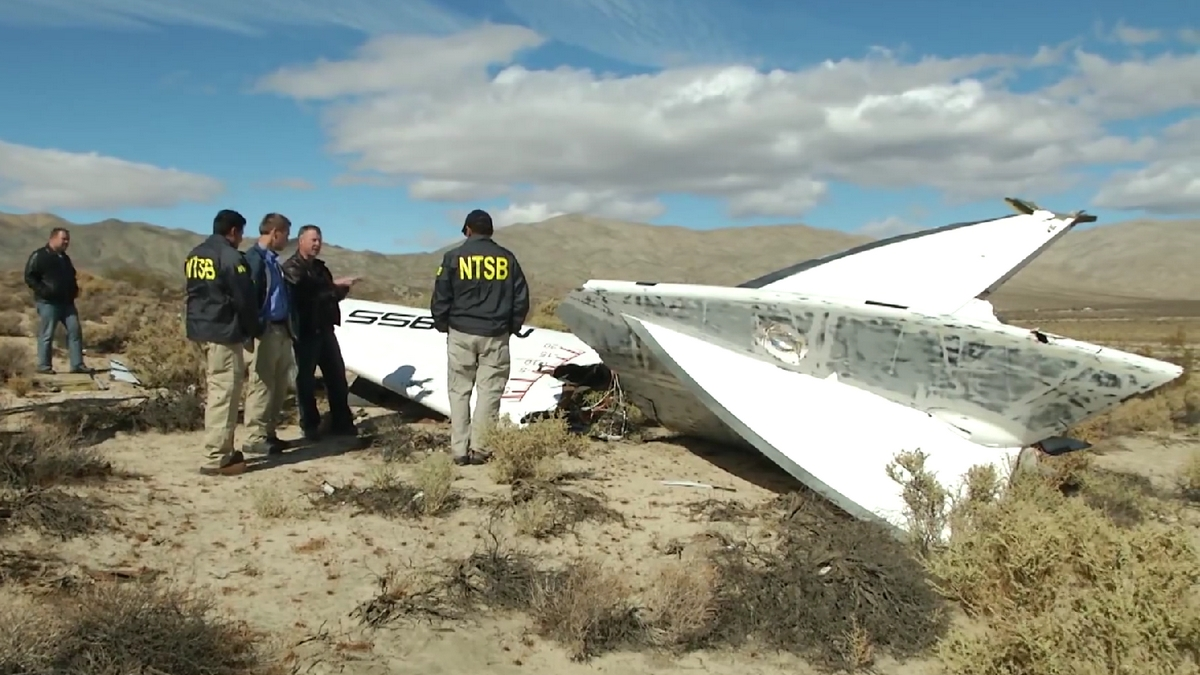
NTSB Go-Team inspects a tail section of VSS Enterprise

The National Transportation Safety Board (NTSB) investigated the accident. A Go Team was dispatched to the accident site on October 31, 2014. The team, consisting of around fifteen personnel, arrived at the Mojave Air and Space Port on November 1. They began their investigation that day.

At a news conference on November 2, NTSB acting chairman Christopher Hart said the lock–unlock lever for the vehicle's feathering mechanism was moved to the unlocked position at slightly above Mach 1. SpaceShipTwo's feathering mechanism then began moving even though that motion had not been commanded. The on-site investigation was scheduled to take four to seven days. It was reported on November 12 that the on-site investigation had been completed and that parts of the wreckage had been placed in secure storage should they be needed for further investigation. It was expected to take about a year for the final report to be released.

During a hearing in Washington D.C. on July 28, 2015, and a press release on the same day, the NTSB cited inadequate design safeguards, poor pilot training, lack of rigorous federal oversight and a potentially anxious co-pilot without recent flight experience as important factors in the 2014 crash. They determined that the co-pilot, who died in the accident, prematurely unlocked a movable tail section some ten seconds after SpaceShipTwo fired its rocket engine and was breaking the sound barrier, resulting in the craft breaking apart. The Board also found that the Scaled Composites unit of Northrop Grumman, which designed and flew the prototype space tourism vehicle, did not properly prepare for potential human slip-ups by providing a fail-safe system that could have guarded against such premature deployment. "A single-point human failure has to be anticipated," board member Robert Sumwalt said. Instead, Scaled Composites "put all their eggs in the basket of the pilots doing it correctly."

The report's details of the final moments of the flight reveal that the feather system was unlocked as SS2 accelerated under rocket power through Mach 0.92 at 10.07:28, 9 seconds after release from the WhiteKnightTwo (WK2) carrier aircraft and 14 seconds before the vehicle would have reached Mach 1.4, the minimum speed at which the tail was designed to be unlocked. Telemetry, in-cockpit video and audio data confirmed that co-pilot Michael Alsbury announced "unlocking" as Mach 0.92 was passed and vehicle breakup occurred within the next 4 seconds. The feathering device, conceived by Scaled Composites designer Burt Rutan, is deployed after reaching maximum altitude, increasing drag and slowing descent as a carefree and stable reentry method for recovery of SpaceShipOne. The system operates by rotating the vehicle's twin tail booms upward about the trailing edge of the wing by around 65 degrees; following reentry, the actuators rotate the booms down into the flush position for approach and landing. Aerodynamic forces when accelerating through the transonic moments of the flight, above Mach 0.85 and below Mach 1.34, push upwards on the tail; releasing the locks before the vehicle passes these speeds means that a pair of actuators were the only things keeping the tail in place against these powerful forces, which had unintentionally been sufficient on earlier test flights.

Investigators said the developer of the spacecraft failed to include systems to protect against human error, believing that highly trained test pilots were simply incapable of making a wrong move, and that co-pilot Michael Alsbury may have been influenced by time pressure, along with strong vibration and acceleration forces he had not experienced since his last powered test flight in April 2013. The combination "could have increased the co-pilot's stress." The board found that during years of development and flight tests, engineers at Scaled Composites assumed that any pilot mistakes would occur only in reaction to systems failures, not as the cause of such failures. The Flight Test Data Card for this mission, giving information on the test vehicle and the step-by-step mission plan, called for the feathering system to be unlocked at Mach 1.4, but did not indicate that unlocking early could be a danger. The NTSB investigators also found just one email, from 2010, and one presentation slide, from 2011, that even mentioned the risks of unlocking before completing the transonic stage of the acceleration. The NTSB members also criticized the FAA, which approved the experimental test flights, for failing to pay enough attention to human factors or to provide necessary guidance to the nascent commercial space flight industry on the topic. They also cited pressure from some FAA managers to quickly approve experimental flight permits, sometimes without fully understanding technical issues or the details of the spacecraft.

In its submission to the NTSB, Virgin Galactic says the second SS2, nearing completion, had been modified with an automatic mechanical inhibit device to prevent locking or unlocking of the feather during safety-critical phases. An explicit warning about the dangers of premature unlocking has also been added to the checklist and operating handbook, and a formalized crew resource management (CRM) approach, already used by Virgin for its WK2 operations, is being adopted for SS2. This will include call-outs and a challenge/response protocol. While the report cites CRM issues as a likely contributing cause, Virgin says there is no plan to modify the cockpit display system.

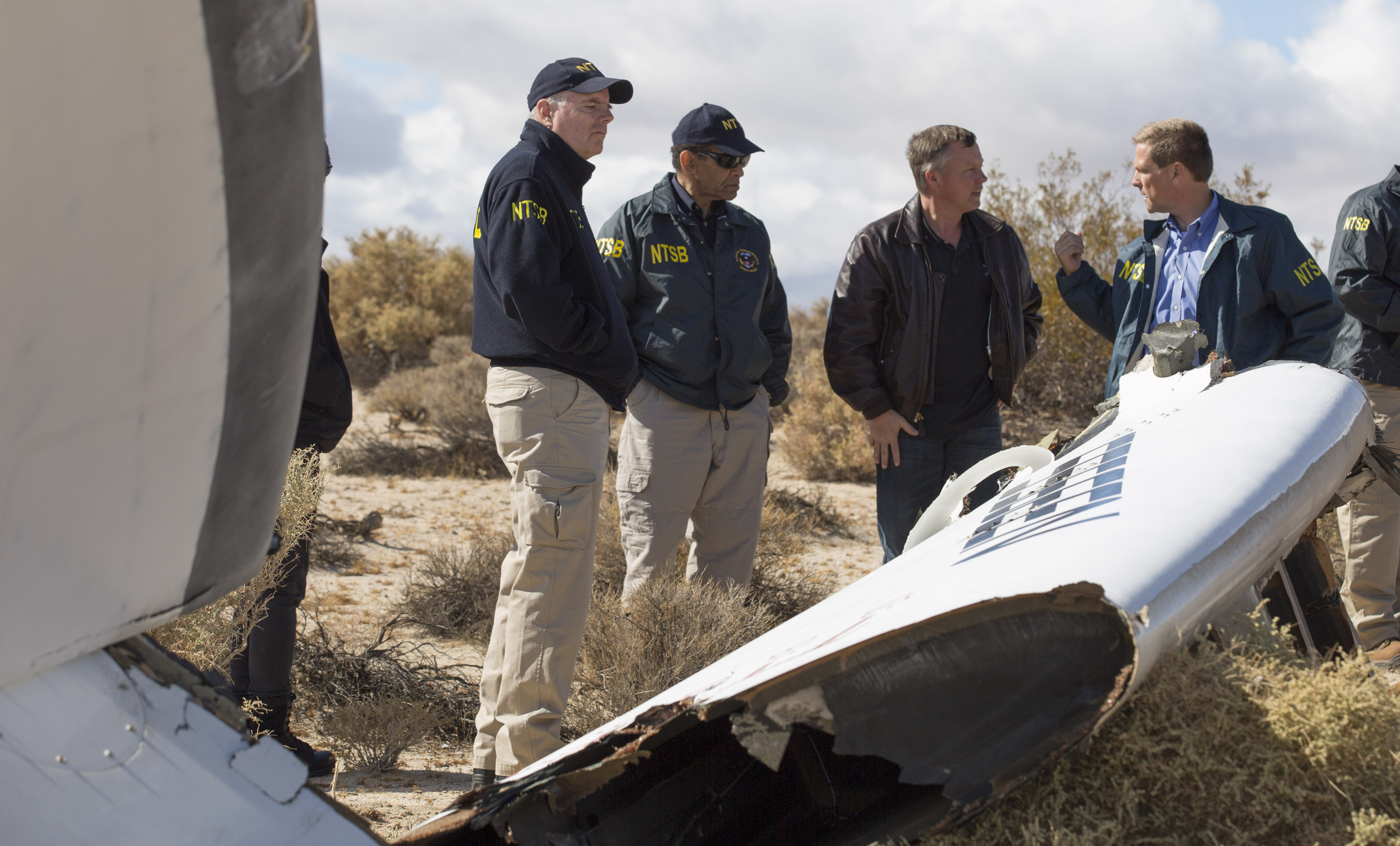
NTSB staff talk with Virgin Galactic pilot Todd Ericson

NTSB chairman Christopher Hart said that, as the Board had learned "with a high degree of certainty the events that resulted in the breakup", he hoped the investigation would prevent such an accident from happening again. "Many of the safety issues that we will hear about today arose not from the novelty of a space launch test flight, but from human factors that were already known elsewhere in transportation." Hart added "for commercial spaceflight to successfully mature, we must meticulously seek out and mitigate known hazards, as a prerequisite to identifying and mitigating new hazards." Virgin Galactic is proceeding with its plans for space flight and is building another craft; company officials said that their commitment to commercial spacecraft had not wavered despite the crash and they expected the company to resume test flights later in 2015, though that date subsequently slipped. On 19 February 2016, Enterprise's successor, VSS Unity, was unveiled by Scaled Composites and Virgin Galactic.

== Responses ==
Virgin Galactic CEO George T. Whitesides, in a news conference following the incident, said that "Space is hard and today was a tough day." Virgin founder Richard Branson said after the crash: "We do understand the risks involved and we are not going to push on blindly—to do so would be an insult to all those affected by this tragedy. We are going to learn from what went wrong, discover how we can improve safety and performance and then move forwards together," and "Space is hard, but worth it."

Michael Moses, Head of Operations for Virgin Galactic, admitted to tensions between Richard Branson's upbeat projections and the persistent hurdles that challenged the company's technical experts. "There's a difference between the marketing and the engineering sides of the company", Mr. Moses said on November 10, 2014.

The International Association for the Advancement of Space Safety (IAASS) heavily criticized Virgin Galactic within hours of the accident. Tommaso Sgobba, Executive Director of the IAASS, claimed that Virgin Galactic had refused to let IAASS scientists review its procedures and snubbed industry gatherings. He stated: "They operated in secrecy, which is difficult to understand. They don't use modern techniques in putting safety into the design. They use outdated methods like testing and then seeing what happens. There has been no independent oversight. There is no peer review. I have been saying for some years now this was an accident waiting to happen." Sgobba, the former head of flight safety for the European Space Agency, said on November 6, 2014, that industry best practice called for operators to build in "two-failure tolerance", or sufficient safeguards to survive two separate, unrelated failures—two human errors, two mechanical errors or one of each. "What we see in the incident is what we call 'zero-failure tolerance'," Mr Sgobba said. "So you make the mistake—you have a catastrophe. The design would not be acceptable in other safety-critical industries, such as aircraft manufacture."

Other members of the IAASS were quick to provide public comment on the rocket propulsion system before the completion of the NTSB investigation. Rocket-powered dragster builder and IAASS spokesperson Carolynne Campbell-Knight said that Virgin Galactic "should stop, give up. Go away and do something they might be good at like selling mobile phones. They should stay out of the space business.". Geoff Daly wrote to the U.S. Chemical Safety Board in July 2013 describing his safety concerns over SpaceShipTwo. Daly's concerns centered around the use of nitrous oxide in the hybrid propulsion system. Despite these public criticisms, the final NTSB report found that the propulsion system did not in fact contribute to the breakup of the vehicle.

Several key employees had resigned from Virgin Galactic within the year leading up to the crash, including the Vice-President of Safety, Jon Turnipseed, and Vice-President of Propulsion, Thomas Markusic.

In an editorial in Time magazine on October 31, 2014, Jeffrey Kluger concluded, "A fatal accident in the Mojave Desert is a lesson in the perils of space hubris. It's hard not to be angry, even disgusted, with Branson himself. He is, as today's tragedy shows, a man driven by too much hubris, too much hucksterism and too little knowledge of the head-crackingly complex business of engineering. For the 21st century billionaire, space travel is what buying a professional sports team was for the rich boys of an earlier era: the biggest, coolest, most impressive toy imaginable."

On November 13, 2014, the Wall Street Journal published an article discussing the history of safety and technical problems of the aircraft, citing unnamed engineers and a former government official involved with the project. According to the article, the official said that nagging vibrations were "very distressing to pilots because they simply couldn't read their instruments"; Virgin Galactic denies this claim. The engine did not have enough power to lift six passengers into space, so Virgin Galactic switched to a new nylon-based fuel, the Journal reported. At a test of the new fuel earlier in 2013, "an explosion all but obliterated the test stand", according to the Journal's sources.

In 2021, both Alsbury (posthumously) and Siebold were honorarily awarded the FAA Commercial Astronaut Wings.

== In popular culture ==
The incident was featured in the 2018 episode "Deadly Mission" of the Canadian TV series Mayday.

== See also ==
- List of spaceflight-related accidents and incidents
- VSS Unity VP-03
