= Peter Siebold =

American astronaut

- Born: 1971 (age 54–55)
- Education: California Polytechnic State University, San Luis Obispo
- Occupation: Test Pilot
- Space career

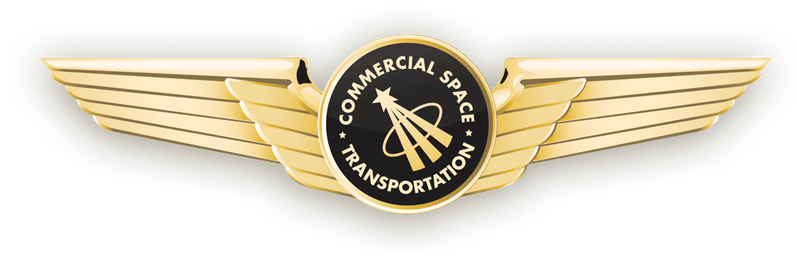
Virgin Galactic commercial astronaut (honorary)
- Selection: SpaceShipOne 2003
- Missions: None

Peter Siebold (born 1971) is a member of the Scaled Composites astronaut team. He is their Vice President of Flight Operations, and was one of the test pilots for SpaceShipOne and SpaceShipTwo, the experimental spaceplanes developed by the company. On April 8, 2004, Siebold piloted the second powered test flight of SpaceShipOne, flight 13P, which reached a top speed of Mach 1.6 and an altitude of 32.0 kilometres (105,000 ft). On October 31, 2014, Siebold and Michael Alsbury were piloting the SpaceShipTwo VSS Enterprise on flight PF04, when the craft came apart in mid-air and then crashed, killing Alsbury and injuring Siebold.

Siebold is the only person in history to have survived an in-flight spacecraft breakup, having fallen 50,000 feet (15,000 m) upon breakup, with his parachute deploying automatically at about 20,000 feet.

== Career ==
Peter Siebold, a 1990 graduate of Davis Senior High School in Davis, California, obtained his pilot's license at age 16. He has been a design engineer at Scaled Composites since 1996. Siebold holds a degree in aerospace engineering from California Polytechnic University at San Luis Obispo, from 2001.

Siebold was responsible for the simulator, navigation system, and ground control system for the SpaceShipOne project at Scaled. Although he was one of four qualified pilots for SpaceShipOne, Siebold did not pilot the craft during the flights later in 2004 to meet the requirements of the Ansari X Prize. Although Siebold flew SpaceShipOne to an altitude of 32 kilometres (20 mi), he did not cross the 100 km (62 mi) Kármán line—the international standard for reaching space.

For his contribution to the SpaceShipOne project, Siebold, along with Mike Melvill and Brian Binnie, received the 2004 Iven C. Kincheloe Award presented by the Society of Experimental Test Pilots.

Siebold became the Director of Flight Operations at Scaled. He was the pilot who flew the White Knight Two on its maiden flight on December 21, 2008. He won the Iven C. Kincheloe Award a second time in 2009, this time individually, for his work on the first WhiteKnightTwo, VMS Eve, as chief test pilot.

=== SpaceShipTwo VSS Enterprise crash ===
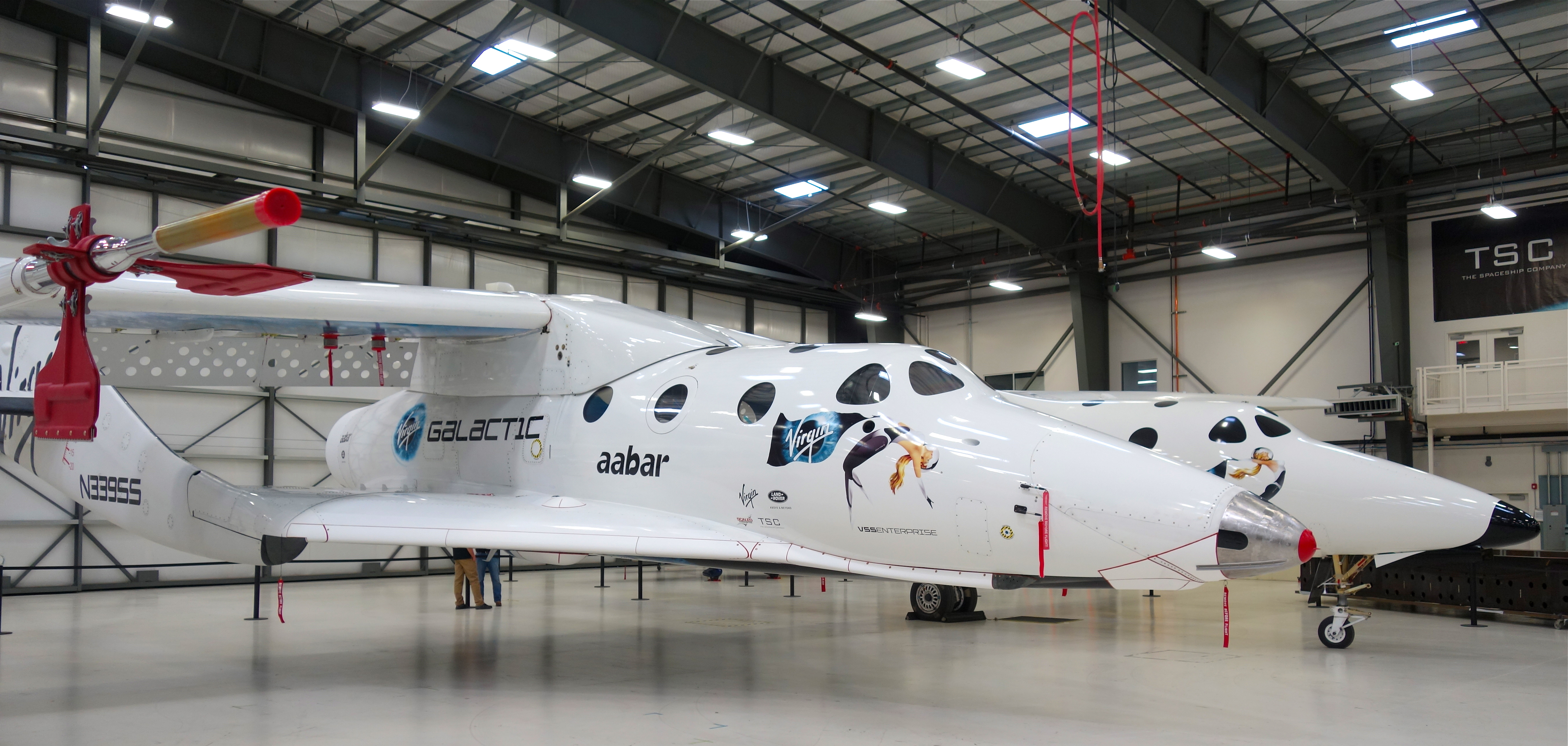
VSS Enterprise, the spacecraft involved in the accident, attached to its mothership, VMS Eve

On October 31, 2014, Siebold was one of the two pilots flying the Virgin Galactic SpaceShipTwo, VSS Enterprise on a test flight, along with Michael Alsbury. The flight suffered an anomaly, resulting in the death of Alsbury and the loss of Enterprise. VSS Enterprise crashed in the California Mojave Desert. Thrown clear of the Enterprise when it broke up in mid-air, Siebold survived a descent from about 50,000 feet (15,000 m) at Mach 1 speed with just a flightsuit. His parachute deployed automatically at about 20,000 feet (6,100 m). After landing, he was taken to the hospital for treatment. He suffered from eyesight degradation and eye pains. He was unable to keep his eyes open and he did not open his right eye until emergency personnel arrived.

Siebold's flight suit was saturated with blood from an injury to his right arm. He did not feel any lower body injuries. As Siebold removed his parachute harness he felt a "clunking noise" in his chest, and became concerned about a potential spinal fracture. Upon arrival at the ER his flight suit was cut away.

Siebold experienced a non-compound four-part fracture of his right humerus. The ball of his ankle was also dislocated and fractured. He had a non-displaced fracture of his right clavicle, a small gash in his right elbow (source of the blood on his flight suit), a deep scrape on his right wrist, and multiple scrapes on the back of his right shoulder. There was considerable bruising on the right side of his chest, but he did not know how it occurred. He did not recall any bruising on his left side. He had an abrasion under his chin which he felt was consistent with the location of his chin strap, as well as multiple contusions and scrapes on his face. He was diagnosed with corneal scratches, and doctors removed a piece of fiberglass from his left eye during a hospital stay. His eyes did not improve so he saw an ophthalmologist after being discharged. The ophthalmologist removed some foreign matter from his left eyelid and a "silver sliver" from his right cornea. His eyes improved immediately post procedure.
