= Michael Alsbury =

American test pilot (1975–2014)

- Born: March 19, 1975; Santa Clara, California, U.S.
- Died: October 31, 2014 (aged 39); Mojave Desert near Cantil, California, U.S.
- Education: California Polytechnic State University (BS)
- Occupation: Test pilot
- Space career

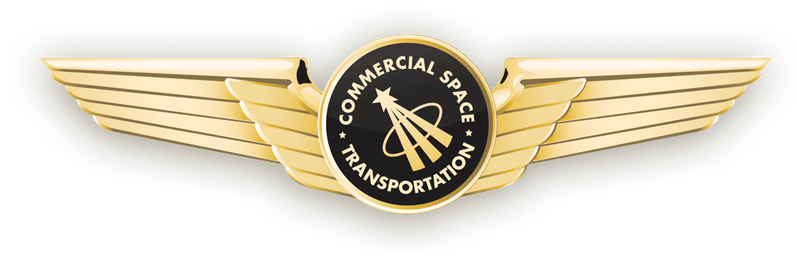
Virgin Galactic commercial astronaut (honorary)
- Missions: None

Michael Tyner Alsbury (March 19, 1975 – October 31, 2014) was an American test pilot for Scaled Composites. He died on October 31, 2014, during test flight PF04 of the Virgin Galactic SpaceShipTwo VSS Enterprise.

== Personal life ==
Michael was born to Rich and Linda Alsbury in Santa Clara, California, but grew up in Scotts Valley, California, graduating from Soquel High School as a valedictorian in 1993. He was an Eagle Scout, and also played soccer at a young age. Alsbury was a flying enthusiast since childhood, achieving his pilot's license at the age of 23. He graduated from California Polytechnic State University in San Luis Obispo with a Bachelor of Science degree in Aeronautical Engineering. Immediately out of college, Alsbury began work at Scaled Composites. He was married to Michelle Saling, whom he had met at Cal Poly, for 12 years and had two children, aged 7 and 10 at the time of his death, living in Tehachapi.

== Career ==
Alsbury joined Scaled Composites in 2001 and began working as a project engineer and pilot. In April 2013, he served as copilot to Mark Stucky on the first powered flight for VSS Enterprise and SpaceShipTwo.

At the time of his death, he had 1800 flight hours, 1600 of them as a test pilot and engineer with Scaled Composites.

In 2013, he received the Ray E. Tenhoff Award for the most outstanding technical paper at the Society of Experimental Test Pilots symposium along with Mark Stucky and Clint Nichols.

On October 31, 2014, Alsbury was test flying the Virgin Galactic SpaceShipTwo, VSS Enterprise with Peter Siebold. The craft broke up in-flight, resulting in a total loss of VSS Enterprise, which crashed in the California Mojave Desert. Alsbury was unable to exit the spacecraft, and his remains were found still strapped to his seat in the fuselage. The pilot, Peter Siebold, survived. It was the ninth time that Alsbury had flown aboard the aircraft.

== Legacy ==
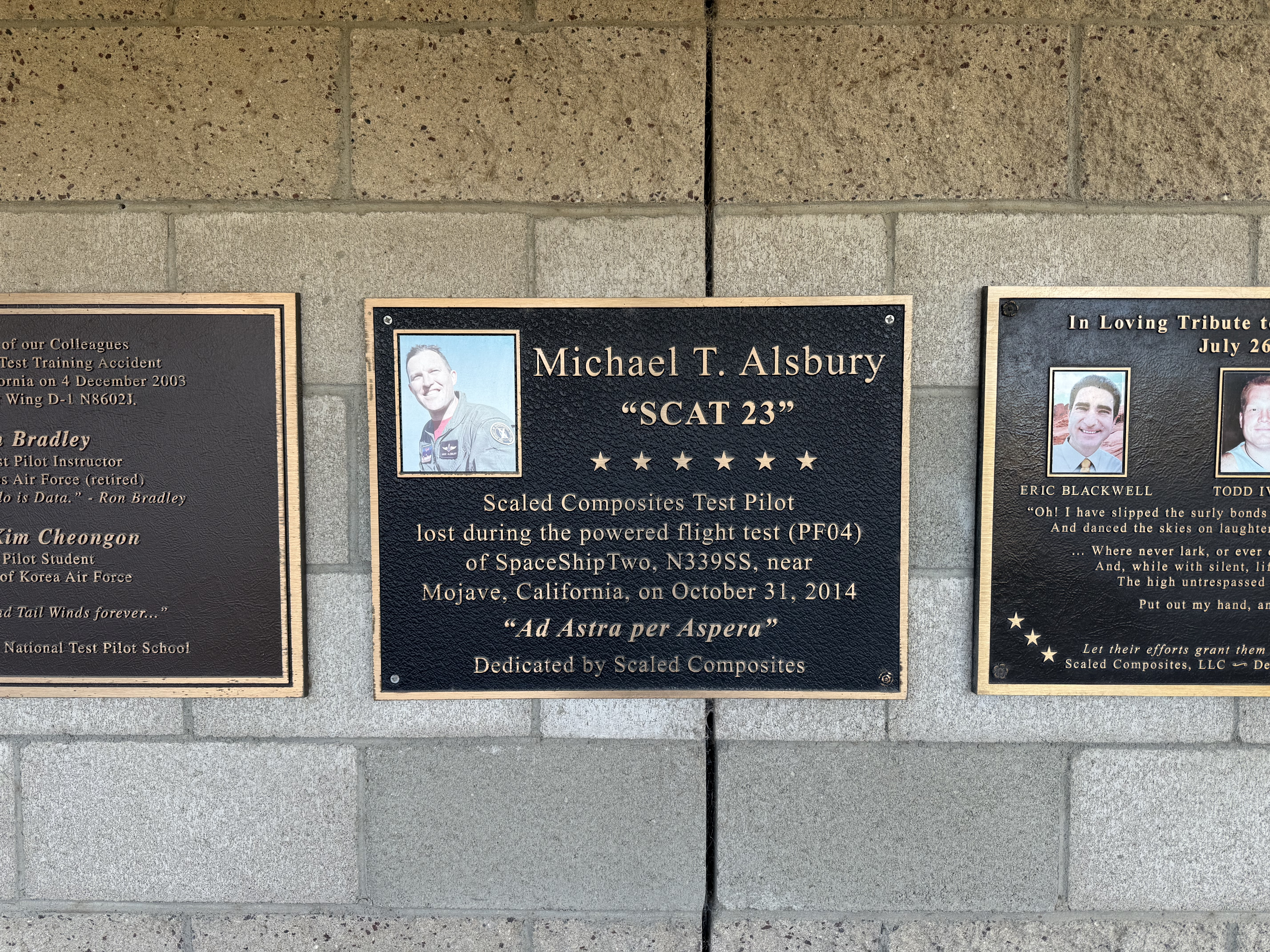
Memorial plaque at Mojave Air & Space Port

On November 4, 2014, episode 5 of BBC One's Human Universe, presented by Brian Cox, was dedicated to Alsbury, as it had a sequence on Virgin Galactic test pilot David Mackay.

His name was added to the Space Mirror Memorial in 2020.

He was posthumously awarded the FAA Commercial Astronaut Wings in 2021.
