= List of spaceflight non-fatal training accidents =

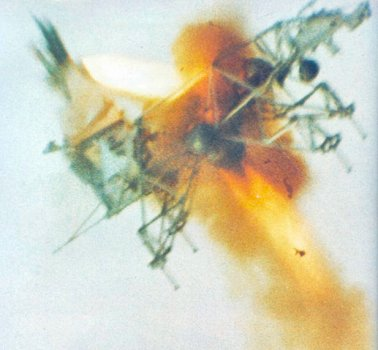
Test pilot Stuart Present ejects safely from the Lunar Landing Training Vehicle. Neil Armstrong also made such an ejection. (NASA)

Spaceflight-related accidents and incidents during assembly, testing, and preparation for flight of crewed and uncrewed spacecraft have occasionally resulted in injuries or the loss of craft since the earliest days of space programs.

== 1960–1969 ==
- Three of the five Lunar Landing Research and Training vehicles (LLRV and LLTV) were destroyed in crashes near Houston, Texas:
  - 1968 May 6: LLRV No. 1 crashed at Ellington AFB, Texas, caused by loss of helium pressure that controlled the steering jets. Neil Armstrong ejected safely.
  - 1968 December 8: LLTV No. 1 crashed at Ellington AFB, Texas, caused by failure of the fly-by-wire control system. MSC test pilot Joseph Algranti ejected safely.
  - 1971 January 29: An LLTV crashed at Ellington AFB, Texas, caused by failure of the fly-by-wire control system. NASA test pilot Stuart Present ejected safely.
- 1960 July 16: Injured during centrifuge training : Soviet cosmonaut Anatoly Yakovlevich Kartashov suffered pinpoint hemorrhages of the spine during centrifuge training. Due to the injuries he was grounded by the medical staff and retired from the cosmonaut group on 7 April 1962
- 1961 August 19: Parachute training accident, broken left foot : Cosmonaut Pavel Belyayev broke his left foot during a parachute jump related to cosmonaut training. As a result, he was out of cosmonaut training until 30 August 1962.
- 1961 September 2: T-33 jet engine failure, emergency landing : Astronauts Gus Grissom and Alan Shepard experienced a broken rotor blade in the jet engine of their T-33 jet while flying a training mission over Lake Erie. Grissom made an emergency landing at Selfridge Air Force Base near Detroit, MI. Both astronauts left in the same jet a day later.
- 1962 October 22: Experimental Paraglider, hard landing : Astronaut Gus Grissom was piloting an experimental paraglider at Edwards Air Force Base, CA, that was towed aloft by another aircraft and released. The paraglider made a hard landing that crumpled the nose wheel. The craft remained upright and Grissom walked away unhurt. The craft was part of experiments that were to lead up to landing Gemini spacecraft using a similar paraglider wing on dry land.
- 1963 March 13: F-102 jet, ran off paved runway : Astronaut Elliot See was piloting a NASA F-102 fighter jet used to maintain astronaut pilot proficiency when it ran off the end of the paved runway while landing at Ellington AFB near Houston, TX. Officials said the astronaut landed the plane too fast and was unable to stop on the paved portion of the runway. Astronaut See was not injured and the aircraft was not damaged and was flown later in the day by another astronaut.
- 1964 August 25 : Simulated Moon Walk in Spacesuit, fall on steep, rocky lava bed : Astronaut Walter Cunningham was wearing a full spacesuit with 13.5 kg backpack. He was simulating a Moon walk on a rocky lava bed near Bend, Oregon. While climbing a 15-meter, 30 degree slope, he was 3 meters from the top when he fell backward. At first, observers thought he might roll all the way to the bottom of the slope, but Cunningham spread out to slow his motion and a nearby engineer also provided assistance. Cunningham was uninjured, but there was a slight pressure loss in the suit from a glove puncture.
- 1964 November 4 : T-38 jet, ran off wet runway, landing gear damaged : Astronauts Charles "Pete" Conrad and James Lovell were landing at Ellington AFB near Houston, TX, during a rainstorm, on a flight from Washington, DC. They were returning from the funeral of astronaut Theodore C. Freeman. They were unable to stop their aircraft on the wet runway. The aircraft ran off the runway and into a muddy, grassy area damaging the landing gear. The two astronauts were not injured in the mishap.
- 1966 January 14 : Altitude Chamber, oxygen valve explosion, fire : Astronaut Edward Givens was testing the Gemini 9 astronaut maneuvering unit (AMU) while wearing a spacesuit in an altitude chamber at the Manned Spacecraft Center (Johnson Space Center), Houston, TX. While in the altitude chamber, an oxygen valve exploded outside the altitude chamber burning four technicians and sending one of them to the hospital. One of the technicians' clothes was set on fire and the other three technicians suffered minor burns extinguishing the burning clothing. Astronaut Givens was not injured in the incident.
- 1966 January 28 : Zero G Training, dislocated shoulder requiring surgery : Astronaut Donn F. Eisele underwent surgical repair of his left shoulder due to a dislocation received during zero-G flight training in 1965. The shoulder was reinjured during physical training at the Manned Spacecraft (Johnson Space) Center later the same year.
- 1966 July 18 : T-38 jet takeoff abort, ran off runway : Astronauts Edward H. White and Russell Schweickart experienced an engine failure during takeoff from El Paso International airport, TX, on their T-38 jet aircraft. The takeoff was aborted and the aircraft ran off the end of the runway, suffering a nose gear collapse and blowouts of both main landing gear tires. The astronauts were flying from Houston, TX to Los Angeles, CA. The stop in El Paso was to refuel. Both astronauts were uninjured and continued their journey on a commercial airliner.
- 1966 October 8: Parachute training accident, broken foot : Cosmonaut Georgi Grechko broke his foot during a parachute jump related to training for the Soyuz 7K crewed lunar flyby missions. The injury forced him out of training for those lunar flyby missions.
- 1968 May 15 : Parachute training, fracture : Astronaut Dr. Robert A. R. Parker suffered a fractured coccyx (the final bone in the spine), while taking part in parachute training. The injury occurred at Williams Air Force Base, Arizona. The injury was not thought to be serious.
- 1968 September 26 : Physical training, fractured collar bone : Astronaut Dr. Karl G. Henize suffered a fractured collar bone during a physical development class as part of astronaut training. He was placed on non-flying status for about five weeks.
- 1969 : Rope training accident, serious leg injury : Cosmonaut Vladimir Kovalyonok suffered a serious injury to his leg while rope training (climbing?) during cosmonaut training. He recovered and was able to continue cosmonaut training and graduated 18 August 1969.
- 1969 August 2 : helicopter landing accident : During NASA astronaut helicopter flight training, astronaut Edward G. Gibson, flying solo, landed a helicopter on a mud flat, near Laporte, TX. The helicopter sank in the mud, flipped over and its spinning rotor blades tore the craft apart. Gibson was uninjured.
- 1969 August 15: T-33 jet crash landing : Astronaut Joseph Kerwin made a belly landing on a foam covered runway in his T-33 jet trainer at Ellington AFB near Houston, Texas due to a landing gear problem. He survived the crash landing uninjured.

== 1970–1979 ==
- 1971 January 23: helicopter crash: Eugene Cernan was flying a Bell 47G helicopter as part of his Lunar Module training as Backup Commander for Apollo 14. The helicopter crashed into the Indian River at Cape Canaveral, Florida. Cernan nearly drowned because he was not wearing a life vest and received some second-degree burns on his face and singed hair. According to official reports at the time, the crash was the result of pilot error due to Cernan incorrectly judging his altitude. Later accounts, written by Cernan himself in an autobiography, admit he was flying too low and showing off for nearby boaters. The helicopter dipped a skid into the water and crashed. James McDivitt, an Apollo Manager at the time, demanded that Cernan be removed from flight status and not be given command of Apollo 17. Cernan was defended by Deke Slayton and given the Apollo 17 command. James McDivitt resigned as an Apollo Manager shortly after the Apollo 16 mission.
- 1971 April 2 : T-38 jet, rear cockpit canopy lost, takeoff aborted : Astronaut Richard Truly was taking off from Kellogg Field, Battle Creek, MI in a NASA T-38 jet. During the takeoff roll, the rear cockpit canopy flew off the aircraft. Astronaut Truly aborted the takeoff and was not injured. The aircraft suffered minor damage.
- 1972 May 10 : T-38 jet, electrical malfunction, out of fuel, ejected : Astronaut Charles "Pete" Conrad ejected safely from his NASA T-38 jet near Bergstrom AFB, Austin, TX. He landed about 90 meters from the base operations building. An electrical malfunction that caused loss of instruments during severe weather was listed by the review board as a major factor in the accident. Conrad was on a flight from Dover, DE via Dobbins AFB, GA to Ellington AFB, Houston, TX. Due to bad weather, he was diverted first to Hobby Airport, Houston because Ellington AFB was below minimums for landing. While on final approach to Hobby Airport, in darkness, heavy rain and lightning, the T-38 generator failed, causing a loss of cockpit lighting and partial loss of navigation instruments. Conrad broke off the approach and tried to climb above the bad weather. The generator was brought back online along with cockpit lighting. Because of the electrical problems, he requested a diversion to an airport that was under visual flight rules. Controllers sent him toward Randolph AFB, San Antonio, TX. It soon became apparent the T-38 did not have enough fuel to reach Randolph AFB. Controllers then diverted him to Bergstrom AFB. The T-38 ran out of fuel as it reached Bergstron AFB. Conrad ejected at 1100 meters. The aircraft was destroyed. He was taken to the base hospital for a routine examination and returned to Houston later that night.
- 1974 February 6 : T-38 jet, landing mishap, gear collapse : Astronaut Dr. Karl G. Henize was involved in a "landing mishap" in his T-38 jet aircraft while landing at Bergstrom AFB near Austin, TX in low visibility conditions. He was on an instrument flight from Ellington AFB near Houston, TX. A landing gear on the T-38 collapsed and the aircraft was damaged. Henize was not injured.
- 1979 October 19: Altitude chamber accident, electrical burns, brain concussion : Cosmonaut Alexander S. Viktorenko was conducting tests in an altitude chamber as part of cosmonaut training. Due to errors by a person operating the altitude chamber, Viktorenko was struck by an electric current, causing burns, a fall and a brain concussion. He was unconscious for 17 hours. As a result of the injuries and recovery, he did not complete his cosmonaut training until 24 February 1982.

== 1980–1989 ==
- 1982 May 21: T-38 jet struck by lightning, damaged : Astronaut Gordon Fullerton was piloting a solo flight of a NASA T-38 jet aircraft from Houston, Texas to Cleveland, Ohio to make a speaking engagement. While on final approach to Cleveland's Hopkins Airport, his aircraft was struck by lightning. Fullerton landed safely but a post-landing inspection showed that a 2-foot by 6-foot section had been torn from the tail of the aircraft. The astronaut later commented, "It felt like a howitzer hit the cockpit. It was as strong a lightning (bolt) as I've ever experienced.".
- 1982 December 1: T-38 jet landing accident, ran off runway : Astronaut Thomas K. Mattingly was not injured when his T-38 jet aircraft ran off the runway at Ellington AFB near Houston, Texas. The aircraft ended up 30 feet off the end of the runway during a landing in heavy rain. There was substantial damage to the wings, nose and landing gear of the aircraft during the incident.
- 1984 April 5 : T-38 jet, struck birds, engine flameout, aborted takeoff : Astronaut James van Hoften was taking off in a T-38 jet on the KSC Space Shuttle runway for a training flight. This was training for the STS-41-C mission of Challenger that launched the next day. At about 1.5 km (1 mi) down the 4.8 km (3 mi) runway, while going 260 km/h (162 mph), his jet struck a flock of birds, causing the right engine to flame out. He applied the brakes and safely aborted takeoff without further aircraft damage. Bird remains were later found on the nose landing gear and the aircraft engine needed to be removed and inspected for further damage.
- 1987 Feb 24: T-38 jet engine failure, fire, emergency landing : Astronaut Brewster Shaw and NASA pilot Robert Rivers experienced an engine failure and fire in their T-38 jet aircraft. The jet was on approach to Los Alamitos Army Air Field, CA, when the right engine failed and caught fire. There was smoke in the cockpit. The crew chose to land the plane rather than bail out because it was over a populated area. They landed successfully and climbed out of the burning jet. The jet experienced substantial damage. The crew was taken to the Long Beach Naval Hospital for observation and later released.
- 1989 May 15 : T-38 jet, near midair collision with airliner : Astronaut David M. Walker was flying a NASA T-38 jet into Dulles Airport near Washington, D.C. for a presidential ceremony. At about 8 km (5 mi) from the airport at an altitude of 2100 meters, he came within 150 meters of colliding with a Pan Am Airbus A310 airliner. He was later found at fault for the incident and suspended from flying for 60 days by NASA. He was also removed as commander of the STS-44 mission.

== 1990–1999 ==
- 1993 May 3 : Emergency egress training, broken bones in foot : Astronaut Dr. M. Rhea Seddon broke four metatarsal bones in her left foot during emergency egress training from the Johnson Space Center orbiter training facility. She was using an inflatable slide similar to those used on airliners during landing emergency evacuations. While sliding down the slide, her left foot became pinned under her, breaking four minor bones. She returned to full-time training after a few weeks.
- 1993 May 28 : frostbitten fingers in thermal vacuum chamber : While training in a thermal vacuum chamber for the STS-61 Hubble repair mission, astronaut Story Musgrave suffered frostbite on the fingertips of his right hand. He was working in a spacesuit in the chamber for about six hours at low temperatures. His fingertips were blackened and numb from the incident. Surgery was not required and they were sufficiently healed in time for the repair mission in December 1993.
- 1993 October 16: Medical experiment, heart and breathing stopped : Astronaut Bonnie Dunbar suffered an allergic reaction to an experimental drug and collapsed during medical tests at Johnson Space Center, Texas. Her breathing and heart stopped and she was rushed to a local hospital. She recovered and was later declared in good health. The experiment involved injecting dye and a drug to measure the effect of weightlessness on fluids in the body.

== 2000–2009 ==
- 2000 March 15 : sprained ankle delays shuttle launch : Astronaut and commander of the STS-101 mission, James D. Halsell sprained his ankle climbing down steps inside of a Space Shuttle simulator at Johnson Space Center, Houston. This caused him to miss some training activities and delayed the launch of his mission by about a week.
- 2003 December 2 : NASA Gulfstream II Shuttle Training Aircraft - engine thrust reverser fell off aircraft in flight : A NASA Gulfstream II shuttle Training Aircraft (STA) was flying a series of simulated shuttle landings to the Kennedy Space Center shuttle landing facility. On board the aircraft were an unidentified NASA astronaut pilot and two training personnel. The aircraft was on final approach at 13,000 feet when on-board instruments indicated a malfunction on one of the jet engine thrust reversers. The aircraft landed safely. A post-landing inspection showed that one of the 585-pound, 4-foot-wide, 5-foot-long thrust reversers had fallen off the aircraft. Divers later found the thrust reverser on the bottom of the nearby Banana River. An investigation showed that a bolt failed, causing the part to fall off the aircraft.
- 2003 December 17 : SpaceShipOne - Landing accident, ran off runway : While piloting SpaceShipOne on its first powered test flight, 11P, astronaut Brian Binnie reached a peak altitude of 20.7 km (13 mi) and exceeded the speed of sound. Upon landing, SpaceShipOne experienced a roll oscillation that caused the left main gear to collapse. The craft ran off the runway and rolled to a stop in soft sand. The craft sustained minor damage, later repaired, and the pilot was uninjured.

== 2020 ==
=== Venus lander ===
In May 2025, the Soviet era Venus ship, Kosmos 482, crashed. It was in orbit for 53 years.

== See also ==
- List of spaceflight-related accidents and incidents
