= 14P =

14P may refer to:

- 14P/Wolf, a comet
- SpaceShipOne flight 14P, a flight of Space Ship One

== See also ==
- P14 (disambiguation)
