= Idea Man =

2011 memoir by Paul Allen

Idea Man: A Memoir by the Cofounder of Microsoft
- Author: Paul Allen
- Language: English
- Genre: Memoir
- Publisher: Penguin Group (U.S.)
- Publication date: April 19, 2011
- Publication place: United States
- Media type: E-book, Print (hardback and paperback), and audiobook
- Pages: 384 pp.
- ISBN: 978-1-59184-382-5
- OCLC: 635459397

Idea Man: A Memoir by the Cofounder of Microsoft is a memoir by Microsoft co-founder Paul Allen, published in 2011 by Portfolio, a Penguin Group imprint. A New York Times Best Seller, the book recounts how Allen became enamored with computers at an early age, conceived the idea for Microsoft, recruited his friend Bill Gates to join him, and launched what would become the world's most successful software company.

The book, reveals the often conflicted partnership between Allen and Gates, and how—when Allen was recovering from cancer—Gates unsuccessfully conspired to dilute Allen's 36 percent share of Microsoft. Idea Man also explores Allen's business and creative ventures following his 1983 departure from Microsoft, including his involvement in SpaceShipOne, his purchase of the Portland Trail Blazers and Seattle Seahawks, his passion for music, and his ongoing support for scientific research.

== Reviews ==
The Guardian: “There's an important lesson here that has subsequently been airbrushed out of the Microsoft legend: Allen's contributions to the partnership were as critical as Gates's. Without the tools that he developed, and his insight into the infrastructure that software development requires, Microsoft's subsequent growth would have been impossible.”

Kirkus Reviews: ..."surprisingly profound and refreshingly frank."

USA Today: “…complete and candid…”

The New York Times: “The book reads well.”
