= P14 =

P14, P-14 or P.14 may refer to:

- P14 (tax), a British tax form
- Aviatik P.14, a German reconnaissance biplane
- Holbrook Municipal Airport, in Navajo County, Arizona, United States
- LSWR P14 class, a British steam locomotive
- P-14 radar, a Soviet radar system
- P14 road (Ukraine)
- Papyrus 14, a biblical manuscript
- Pattern 1914 Enfield, a British rifle
- Škoda-Kauba P14, a German fighter aircraft project

== See also ==
- 14P (disambiguation)
