= SpaceShipOne flight 15P =

First privately funded human spaceflight (2004)

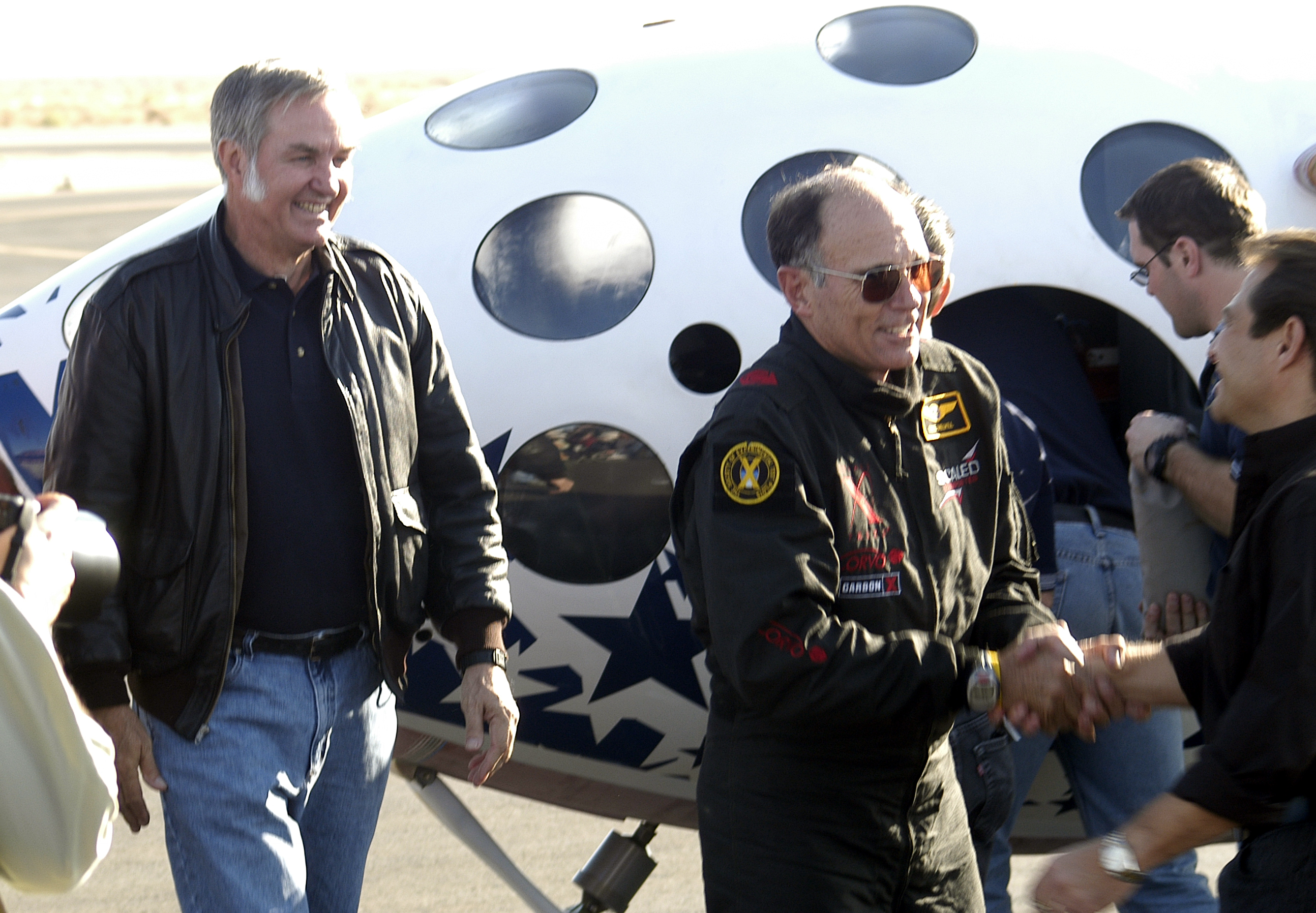
- Pilot Mike Melvill moments after exiting SpaceShipOne and becoming the first private astronaut in history, designer Burt Rutan on the left
- Mission type: Test flight
- Operator: Scaled Composites
- Mission duration: 24 minutes
- Distance travelled: 35 kilometers (22 mi)
- Apogee: 100.124 kilometers (62.214 mi)

Spacecraft properties
- Spacecraft: SpaceShipOne
- Manufacturer: Scaled Composites
- Launch mass: 3,600 kilograms (7,900 lb)
- Dry mass: 1,200 kilograms (2,600 lb)

Crew
- Crew size: 1
- Members: Mike Melvill
- Callsign: SpaceShipOne

Start of mission
- Launch date: June 21, 2004, 14:50 UTC
- Launch site: White Knight, Mojave

End of mission
- Landing date: June 21, 2004, 15:14 UTC
- Landing site: Mojave

Flight 15P of SpaceShipOne (X0) was the first privately funded human spaceflight. It took place on June 21, 2004. It was the fourth powered test flight of the Tier One program, with the previous three test flights reaching much lower altitudes. The flight carried only its pilot, Mike Melvill, who thus became the first non-governmental astronaut.

This flight was a full-altitude test, but not itself a competitive flight for the Ansari X Prize, the prize for the first non-governmental reusable crewed spacecraft. Problems were encountered during the flight but later corrected, paving the way for SpaceShipOne to make competitive flights later in 2004.

== Crew ==
Position	Astronaut
Pilot	Mike Melvill; First spaceflight

== Flight profile ==
All times are in PDT, which is seven hours behind UTC. This was the local civil time at the spaceport on the day of the flight. All measurements are first stated in the U.S. customary units in which they were originally reported, with conversions to SI units also given.

Taxiing for takeoff from Mojave Spaceport was originally planned for 06:30, because the wind conditions in that area are most favorable in the early morning. Taxiing actually started at 06:37, and the flight took off at 06:47. After an ascent to 47,000 feet (14.3 km) coupled with the White Knight airplane, the SpaceShipOne craft separated at 07:50 and immediately ignited its rocket.

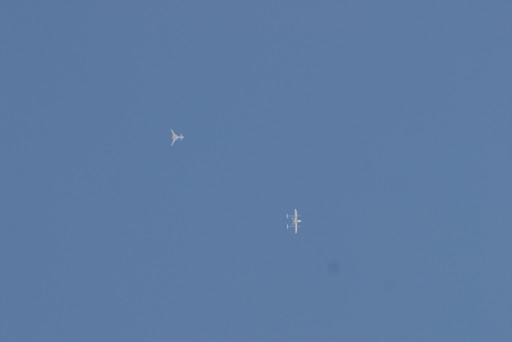
White Knight carried SpaceShipOne aloft, with a Beechcraft Starship flying chase. This photograph was taken from the ground at 06:55.

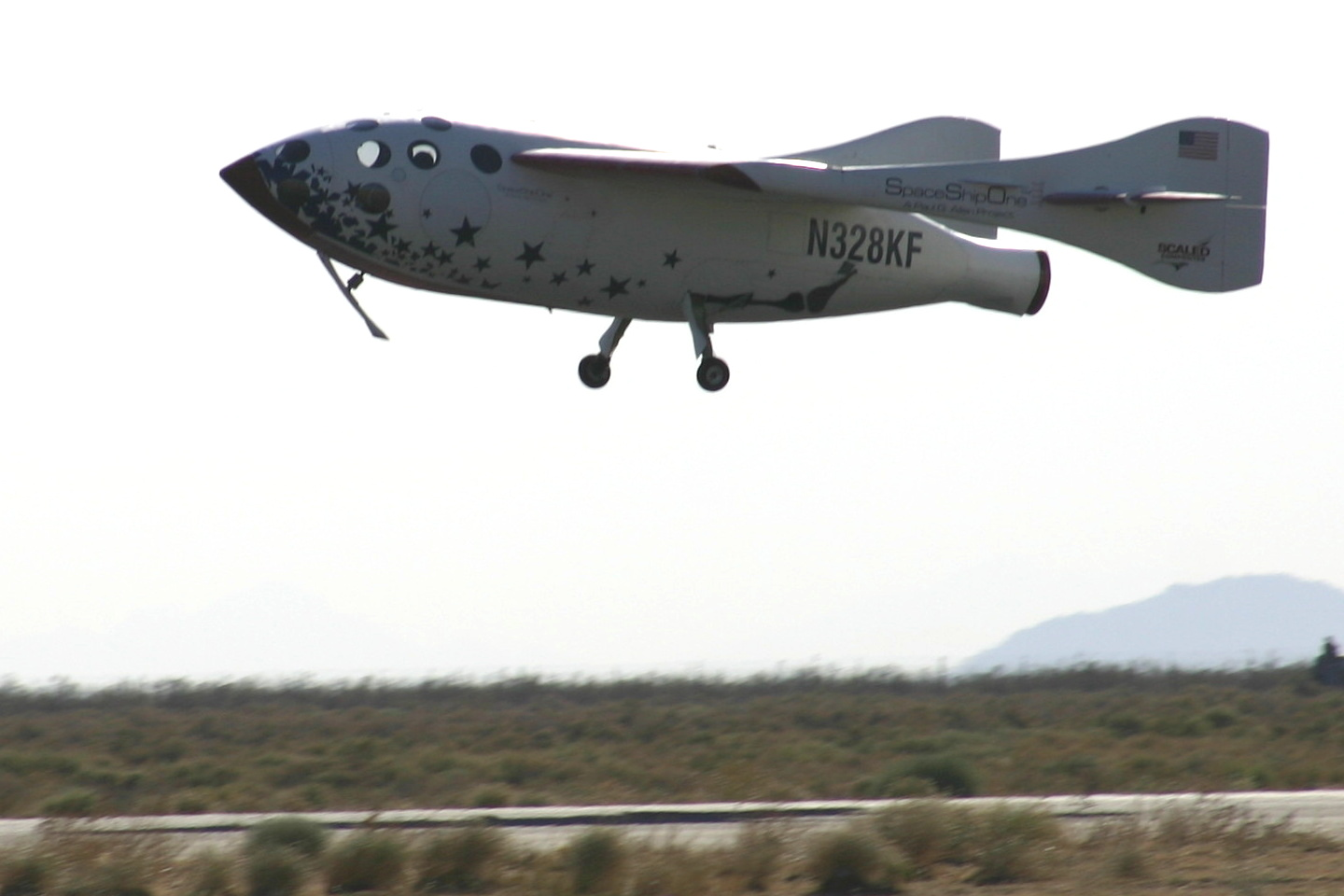
SpaceShipOne landing on Flight 15P

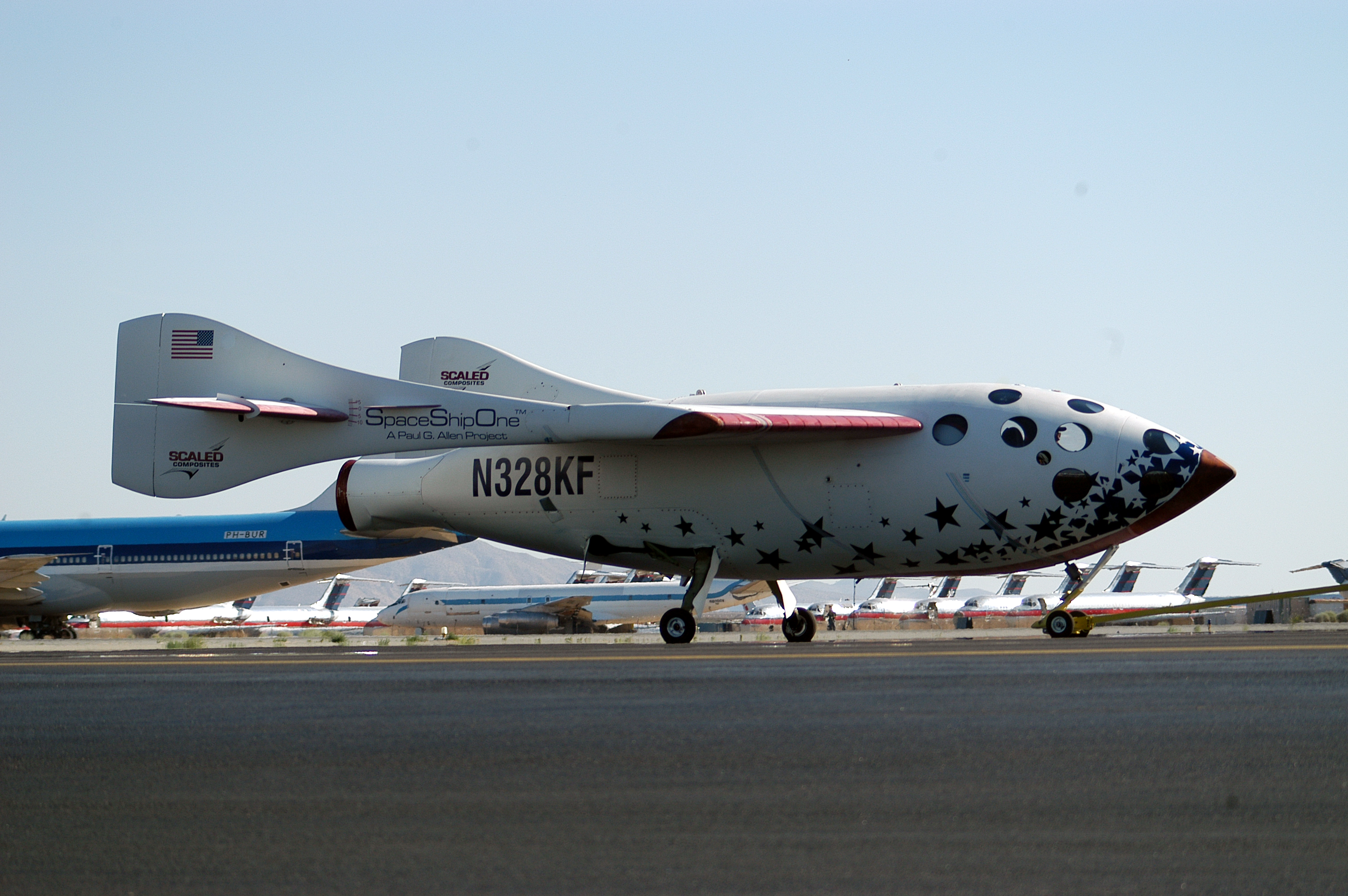
SpaceShipOne Flight 15P photo

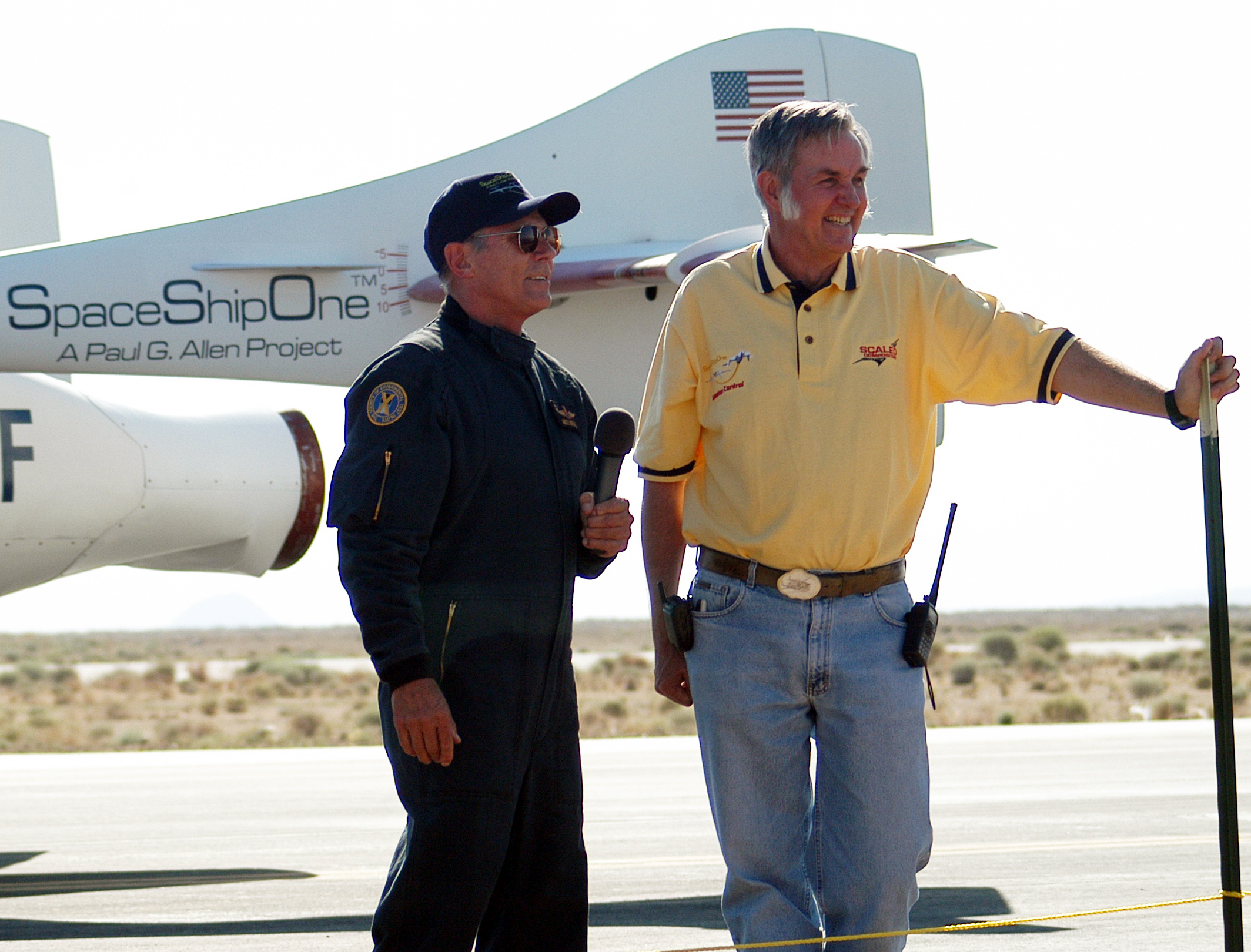
Mike Melvill and Burt Rutan speak to the media after the first flight into Space

Shortly after ignition, at about 60,000 feet (18 km), the craft unexpectedly rolled 90 degrees to the left, due to wind shear. When the pilot attempted to correct it, it rolled 90 degrees to the right. The pilot leveled the craft out and proceeded with the climb. The correction of the roll excursion, using full trim, caused a pitch trim tab to run up against a stop. This caused the trim actuator, as designed, to stop operating for a 3 s timeout. Not realizing what had happened, the pilot and controllers interpreted this as a failure of the trim actuator, and they switched to a backup system. Spacecraft attitude was problematic during the entire climb, and not corrected until the start of re-entry.

During the burn, a new aerodynamic fairing installed around the rocket nozzle overheated, became too soft, and crumpled inwards. This caused a loud bang, which the pilot reported, but did not cause a flight problem.

The rocket burn lasted for 76 seconds. At burn-out the altitude was 180,000 feet (54.9 km), the Mach number was 2.9, and the speed was 2150 mph (3460 km/h; 961 m/s).

The planned apogee altitude was 360,000 feet (110 km), but due to the attitude problem encountered during the climb, the craft actually attained only 328,491 feet (100,124 m). In doing so, it passed the boundary to space at 100 km, making the flight, as planned, officially a spaceflight. It can be calculated that the altitude exceeded 100 km for approximately 10.23 s.

Around apogee the craft experienced about 3 1/2 minutes of weightlessness. Pilot Mike Melvill opened a bag of M&M's and watched them float around the capsule in free fall.

The craft re-entered the atmosphere 22 miles (35 km) south of its planned 5 by 5-mile (8 by 8 km) re-entry zone. The pilot finally corrected the spacecraft's attitude at this point, using a backup trim system. The craft reached Mach 2.9 and experienced deceleration of 5.0 'g (49 m/s²) during descent. The craft switched to gliding configuration at an altitude of 57,000 feet (17.4 km), then returned to the spaceport and landed safely at 08:14.

== Spectacle ==
Scaled Composites, the makers of SpaceShipOne, announced the planned spaceflight on June 2, 2004, and invited the public to watch. An estimated 11,000 people went to Mojave Spaceport to watch the flight, and millions more watched on television. Distinguished attendees included former astronaut Buzz Aldrin and the Commanding officer of Edwards Air Force Base.

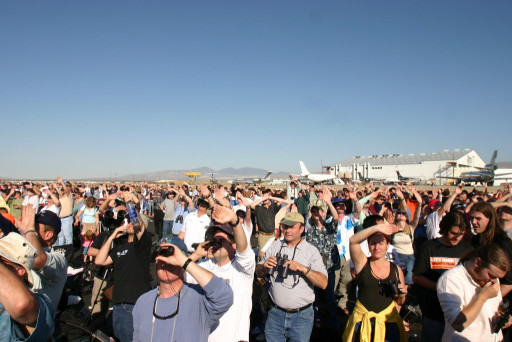
Many spectators turned out to see the flight, but found themselves looking into the sun.

Because SpaceShipOne launches to the east of Mojave Spaceport early in the morning, the crowd at the spaceport found themselves looking into the sun when watching the aircraft. Nevertheless, the crowd was exuberant, cheering every milestone in the flight, including the double sonic boom following the thrust phase. After SpaceShipOne landed, White Knight and the chase planes made celebratory passes over the runway. Mike Melvill displayed great excitement, waving to the crowd while standing on top of SpaceShipOne. He also held up a sign reading "SpaceShipOne, GovernmentZero," given to him by a spectator - an apparent reference to the then-ongoing suspension of Space Shuttle flight operations following the loss of the Space Shuttle Columbia during STS-107. Melvill was greeted by Buzz Aldrin, the second person to have walked on the Moon.

== Reactions ==
NASA administrator Sean O'Keefe issued a statement about the flight, saying:

We applaud the remarkable achievement of Burt Rutan, Paul Allen and test pilot Mike Melvill following the first successful suborbital flight of SpaceShipOne.

Not unlike the first U.S. and Soviet space travelers in 1961, and China's first successful spaceflight last October, these private citizens are pioneers in their own right. They are doing much to open the door to a new marketplace offering the experience of weightlessness and suborbital space flight to the public.

We congratulate the SpaceShipOne team and wish all those who may follow safe flights.

The X Prize Foundation issued a press release about the flight:

We congratulate the entire Scaled Composites' team, in particular Burt Rutan and Mike Melvill for achieving this tremendous milestone. We also thank Paul Allen for his willingness to help open this critical, but risky frontier. The entire X PRIZE organization looks forward to receiving Scaled Composites' 60-day notice indicating they are ready to make their attempt to win the $10 million purse. Once such notice is received, we will make the information publicly available.

The Federal Aviation Administration presented Melvill with astronaut wings in a ceremony at 10:22, two hours after landing.

== Relation to the Ansari X Prize ==
As intended, the flight exceeded the 100 km threshold required for the X PRIZE. However, the flight was not intended as an X PRIZE competitive flight and was not registered as such.

The flight did not carry any passengers, or equivalent ballast, as required for an X PRIZE flight, and so could not qualify as a competitive flight. Furthermore, the X PRIZE rules require a repeat flight within two weeks, which the Scaled Composites team had no intention of making.

Flight 15P was intended to be the final test flight before making the two X PRIZE flights later in 2004. Due to the problems encountered on this flight, an additional test flight might be needed. However, by July 7, 2004, Burt Rutan reported that the faults had been resolved and the next flights would be competitive.

== See also ==
- SpaceShipTwo
- Timeline of private spaceflight
- Virgin Galactic
