= SpaceShipOne flight 11P =

2003 supersonic test flight of SpaceShipOne

- Operator: Scaled Composites
- Maximum altitude: 67,800 ft (20,700 m)

Aircraft properties
- Aircraft: SpaceShipOne
- Aircraft type: Rocket-powered aircraft
- Crew: 1

Flight timeline
- Takeoff date: December 17, 2003
- Takeoff site: Mojave Airport
- Landing date: December 17, 2003
- Landing site: Mojave Airport

Flight 11P of SpaceShipOne was its eighth independent flight, its first powered flight, and the first privately funded crewed flight to reach supersonic speeds. It occurred on December 17, 2003.

The date of the test flight was 100 years to the day (and almost to the hour) since the Wright Brothers made the first powered flight. It followed several months of glide tests. The pilot was Brian Binnie.

== Details ==
White Knight, piloted by Peter Siebold, carried SpaceShipOne to launch altitude. At 08:15 PDT at an altitude of 47,900 feet (14.6 km) and a speed of 112 knots (58 m/s), SpaceShipOne was released from White Knight. After gliding to 44,400 feet (13.5 km) and accelerating to Mach 0.55, the rocket was lit for a 15 second burn.

Nine seconds into the burn, SpaceShipOne exceeded the speed of sound. The craft climbed at a 70-degree angle, accelerating at 3 g (30 m/s²). At burn-out the Mach number was 1.2. The craft coasted to an apogee altitude of 67,800 feet (20.7 km).

The craft was reconfigured into high-drag ("feathered") mode to begin descent. After about a minute of descent, it switched to glider configuration at 35,000 feet (10.7 km). It then glided for 12 minutes back to Mojave Airport.

During landing a roll oscillation caused the left main gear to collapse. The craft made a runway excursion rolling to a stop in soft sand. The craft sustained minor damage, later repaired, and the pilot was uninjured.
