= SpaceShipOne flight 14P =

Third powered flight of SpaceShipOne (2004)

- Operator: Scaled Composites
- Maximum altitude: 211,400 ft (64,400 m)

Aircraft properties
- Aircraft: SpaceShipOne
- Aircraft type: Rocket-powered aircraft
- Crew: 1

Flight timeline
- Takeoff date: May 13, 2004
- Takeoff site: Mojave Airport
- Landing date: May 13, 2004
- Landing site: Mojave Airport

Flight 14P of SpaceShipOne was its third powered flight, which occurred on May 13, 2004. The pilot was Mike Melvill.

== Details ==
SpaceShipOne was released from White Knight at an altitude of 46,000 ft (14.0 km) and a speed of 120 knots (62 m/s). After ten seconds the rocket was lit, for a 55 second burn.

At burn-out the altitude was 150,000 ft (45.7 km) and the Mach number was 2.5. The craft then coasted to an apogee altitude of 211,400 ft (64.4 km).

At one point during the flight, the avionics computer froze up and had to be rebooted. Melvill flew the aircraft manually until the computer became operable again.

During reentry, the craft attained Mach 1.9 and deceleration of 3.5 g (34 m/s²). The craft switched to glider configuration at 55,000 feet (17.4 km). The craft returned to the spaceport and landed safely.
