= Brian Binnie =

United States Navy officer and test pilot (1953–2022)

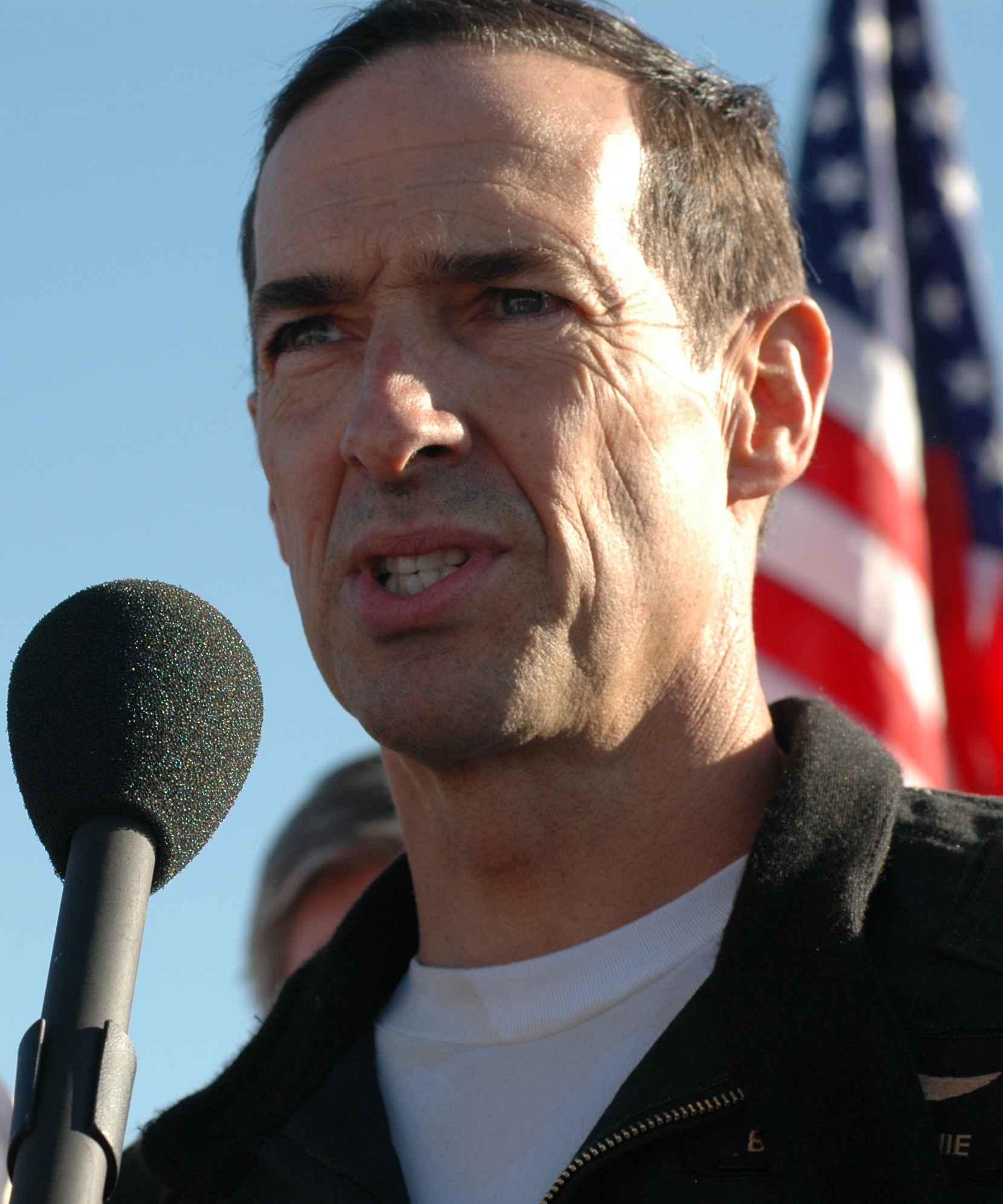
- Binnie in 2004
- Born: April 26, 1953; West Lafayette, Indiana, U.S.
- Died: September 15, 2022 (aged 69)
- Resting place: Arlington National Cemetery
- Education: Brown University; Princeton University
- Occupation: Test pilot
- Space career

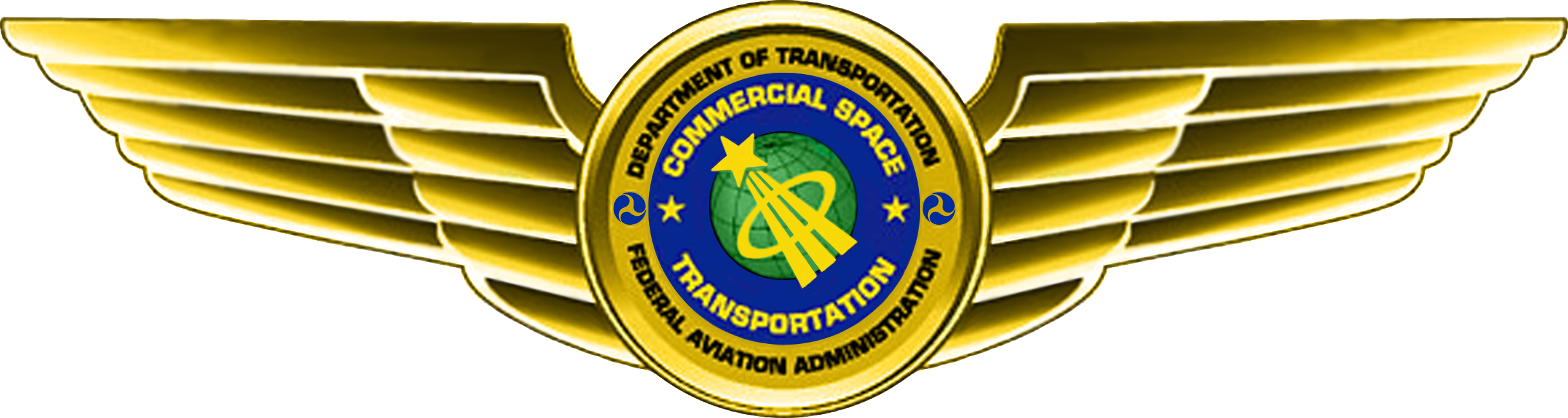
Commercial astronaut
- Rank: Commander, United States Navy
- Time in space: ~5 minutes
- Selection: SpaceShipOne 2003
- Missions: SpaceShipOne flight 17P

William Brian Binnie (April 26, 1953 – September 15, 2022) was a United States Navy officer and one of the test pilots for SpaceShipOne, the experimental spaceplane developed by Scaled Composites and flown from 2003 to 2004.

== Early life ==
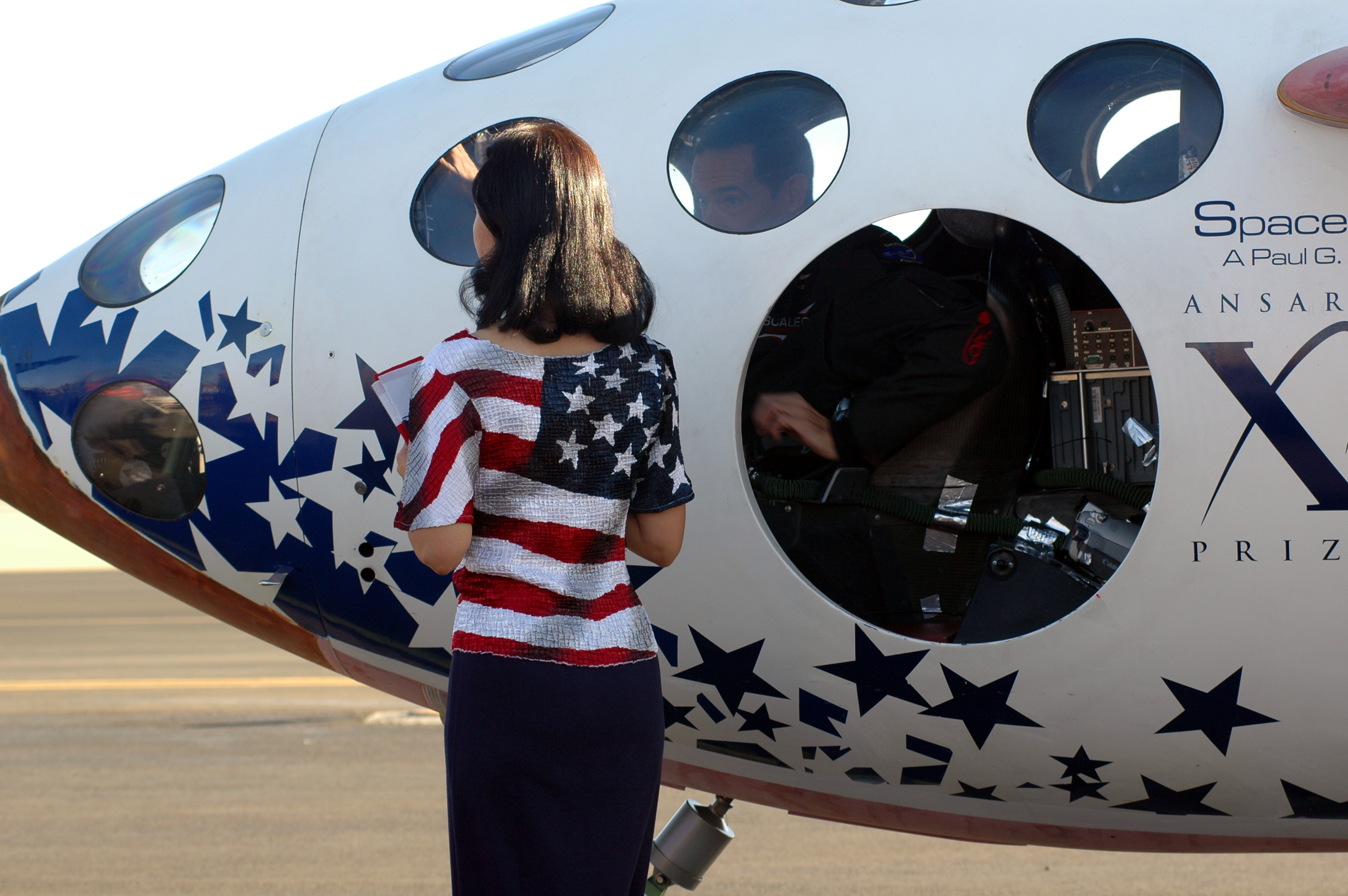
Wife Bub Binnie upon completion of the final flight in October 2004

Binnie was born in West Lafayette, Indiana, on April 26, 1953, where his Scottish father William P. Binnie was a professor of physics at Purdue University. The family returned to Scotland when Binnie was five, and lived in Aberdeen (his father taught at Aberdeen University) and later in Stirling. When Binnie was a teenager the family moved to Boston.

Binnie earned a bachelor's degree in aerospace engineering from Brown University. He earned a master's degree from Brown in fluid mechanics and thermodynamics. Binnie was rejected by the United States Air Force, and enrolled at Princeton University, where he earned a master's degree in mechanical and aerospace engineering He served for 21 years in the United States Navy as a naval aviator, reaching the rank of commander. He flew the LTV A-7 Corsair II, Grumman A-6 Intruder, McDonnell Douglas F/A-18 Hornet, and McDonnell Douglas AV-8B Harrier II. He graduated from the United States Naval Test Pilot School in 1988. Binnie also copiloted the Atmospheric Test Vehicle of the Rotary Rocket. In 2006, he received an honorary degree from the University of Aberdeen.

== SpaceShipOne and spaceflight ==
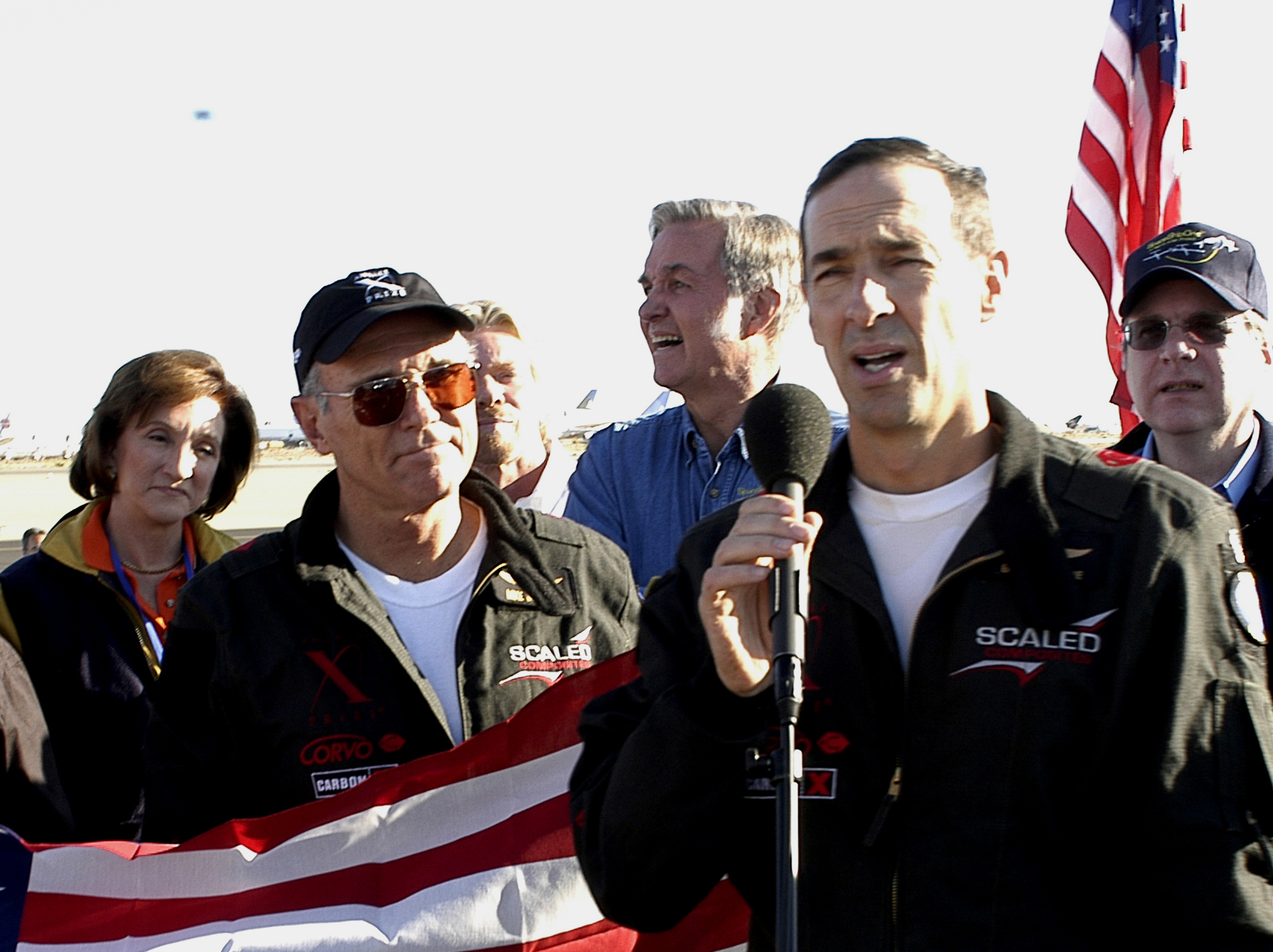
(L–R) Marion Blakey, Mike Melvill, Richard Branson, Burt Rutan, Binnie, and Paul Allen reflect on a mission accomplished in 2004.

On December 17, 2003, the 100th anniversary of the Wright brothers' first powered flight, Binnie piloted the first powered test flight of SpaceShipOne, flight 11P, which reached a top speed of Mach 1.2 and a height of 12.9 miles (20.7 km). On October 4, 2004, he piloted SpaceShipOne's second Ansari X Prize flight, flight 17P, winning the X Prize and becoming the 436th person to go into space. His flight, which peaked at 367,442 feet (69.6 mi; 112.0 km), set a winged aircraft altitude record for suborbital flights, breaking the old record set by the North American X-15 in 1963. It also earned him the second Astronaut Badge to be given by the Federal Aviation Administration for a flight aboard a privately operated commercial spacecraft.

== Later career ==
In 2014 Binnie joined XCOR Aerospace as senior engineer and test pilot, after working as a test pilot and program business manager for Scaled Composites for many years.

== Personal life ==
Binnie and his wife, Bub, had three children.

Binnie died on September 15, 2022, at age 69.
