= SpaceShipOne =

American experimental spaceplane

- SpaceShipOne after its flight into space, June 2004.

General information
- Type: Spaceplane
- Manufacturer: Scaled Composites
- Designer: Burt Rutan
- Primary user: Mojave Aerospace Ventures
- Number built: 1

History
- First flight: 20 May 2003
- Retired: 4 October 2004
- Developed into: SpaceShipTwo
- Preserved at: National Air and Space Museum

SpaceShipOne is an experimental air-launched rocket-powered aircraft with sub-orbital spaceflight capability at speeds of up to 3,000 ft/s (2,000 mph) / 910 m/s (3,300 km/h) using a hybrid rocket motor. The design features a unique "feathering" atmospheric reentry system where the rear half of the wing and the twin tail booms folds 70 degrees upward along a hinge running the length of the wing; this increases drag while retaining stability. SpaceShipOne completed the first crewed private spaceflight in 2004. That same year, it won the US$10 million Ansari X Prize and was immediately retired from active service. Its mother ship was named "White Knight". Both craft were developed and flown by Mojave Aerospace Ventures, which was a joint venture between Paul Allen and Scaled Composites, Burt Rutan's aviation company. Allen provided the funding of approximately US$25 million.

Rutan has indicated that ideas about the project began as early as 1994 and the full-time development cycle time to the 2004 accomplishments was about three years. The vehicle first achieved supersonic flight on December 17, 2003, which was also the one-hundredth anniversary of the Wright Brothers' historic first powered flight. SpaceShipOne's first official spaceflight, known as flight 15P, was piloted by Mike Melvill. A few days before that flight, the Mojave Air and Space Port was the first commercial spaceport licensed in the United States. A few hours after that flight, Melvill became the first licensed U.S. commercial astronaut. The overall project name was "Tier One" which has evolved into Tier 1b with a goal of taking a successor ship's first passengers into space.

The achievements of SpaceShipOne are more comparable to those of the X-15 than to those of orbiting spacecraft like the Space Shuttle. Accelerating a spacecraft to orbital speed requires more than 60 times as much energy as accelerating it to Mach 3. It would also require an elaborate heat shield to safely dissipate that energy during re-entry.

SpaceShipOne's official model designation is Scaled Composites Model 316.

== Design ==
=== Design goal ===
The Scaled Composites Model 316, known as SpaceShipOne, was a spaceplane designed to:

- Carry three humans (one of them a pilot) in a sea-level pressurized cabin.
- Be propelled by rocket from an altitude of 15 km (9.3 mi) to in excess of 100 km (62 mi).
- Reenter atmosphere and shed kinetic energy in an aerodynamically stable configuration.
- Glide transonically and subsonically.
- Land horizontally on a standard runway.

=== Vehicle description ===
The fuselage is cigar-shaped, with an overall diameter of about 1.52 m (5 ft 0 in). The main structure is of a graphite/epoxy composite material. From front to back, it contains the crew cabin, oxidizer tank, fuel casing, and rocket nozzle. The craft has short, wide wings, with a span of 5 m (16 ft) and a chord of 3 m (9.8 ft). Large vertical tailbooms are mounted on the end of each wing, with horizontal stabilizers protruding from the tailbooms. It has gear for horizontal landings.

The overall mass of the fully fueled craft is 3,600 kg (7,900 lb), of which 2,700 kg (6,000 lb) is taken by the fully loaded rocket motor. Empty mass of the spacecraft is 1,200 kg (2,600 lb), including the 300 kg (660 lb) empty motor casing.

Originally the nozzle protruded from the back, but this turned out to be aerodynamically disadvantageous. In June 2004, between flights 14P and 15P, a fairing was added, smoothly extending the fuselage shape to meet the flared end of the nozzle. On flight 15P the new fairing overheated, due to being black on the inside and facing a hot, black nozzle. The fairing softened, and the lower part crumpled inwards during boost. Following that flight the interior of the fairing was painted white, and some small stiffening ribs were added.

The craft has a single unsteerable and unthrottleable hybrid rocket motor, a cold gas reaction control system, and aerodynamic control surfaces. All can be controlled manually. See the separate section below concerning the rocket engine.

The reaction control system is the only way to control spacecraft attitude outside the atmosphere. It consists of three sets of thrusters: thrusters at each wingtip control roll, at the top and bottom of the nose control pitch, and at the sides of the fuselage control yaw. All thrusters have redundant backups, so comprising twelve thrusters in all.

The aerodynamic control surfaces of SpaceShipOne are designed to operate in two distinct flight regimes, subsonic and supersonic. The supersonic flight regime is of primary interest during the boost phase of a flight, and the subsonic mode when gliding. The craft has separate upper and lower rudders, and elevons. These are controlled using aviation-style stick and pedals. In supersonic mode the trim tabs are controlled electrically, whereas the subsonic mode uses mechanical cable-and-rod linkage.

The wings of SpaceShipOne can be pneumatically tilted forwards into an aerodynamically stable high-drag "feathered" shape. This removes most of the need to control attitude actively during the early part of reentry: Scaled Composites refer to this as "care-free reentry". One of the early test flights actually performed re-entry inverted, demonstrating the flexibility and inherent stability of Burt Rutan's "shuttlecock" design. This feathered reentry mode is claimed to be inherently safer than the behavior at similar speeds of the Space Shuttle. The Shuttle undergoes enormous aerodynamic stresses and must be precisely steered in order to remain in a stable glide. (Although this is an interesting comparison of behavior, it is not an entirely fair comparison of design concepts: the Shuttle starts reentry at much higher speed than SpaceShipOne, and so has some very different requirements. SpaceShipOne is more similar to the X-15 vehicle.)

An early design called for a permanently shuttlecock-like shape, with a ring of feather-like stabilising fins. This would have made the spacecraft incapable of landing independently, requiring mid-air retrieval. This was deemed too risky, and the hybrid final design manages to incorporate the feathering capability into a craft that can land in a conventional manner. The tiltable rear sections of the wings and the tailbooms are collectively referred to as "the feather".

The landing gear consists of two widely separated main wheels and a nose skid. These are deployed using springs, assisted by gravity. Once deployed, they cannot be retracted inflight.

The spacecraft is incapable of independent takeoff from the ground. It requires a launch aircraft to carry it to launch altitude for an air launch.

The parts of the craft that experience the greatest heating, such as the leading edges of the wings, have about 6.5 kg (14 lb) of ablative thermal protection material applied. The main ingredient of this material was accidentally leaked to Air and Space. If it flew with no thermal protection, the spacecraft would survive reentry but would be damaged.

The spacecraft's aerodynamic design has an acknowledged "known deficiency" that makes it susceptible to roll excursions. This has been seen on SpaceShipOne flight 15P where wind shear caused a large roll immediately after ignition, and SpaceShipOne flight 16P where circumstances not yet fully understood caused multiple rapid rolls. This flaw is not considered dangerous, but in both of these flights led to the achievement of a much lower altitude than expected. The details of the flaw are not public.

=== Cabin ===
The spacecraft cabin, designed to hold three humans, is shaped as a short cylinder, diameter 1.52 m (5 ft 0 in), with a pointed forward end. The pilot sits towards the front, and two passengers can be seated behind.

The cabin is pressurized, maintaining a sea level breathable atmosphere. Oxygen is introduced to the cabin from a bottle, and carbon dioxide and water vapor are removed by absorbers. The occupants do not wear spacesuits or breathing masks, because the cabin has been designed to maintain pressure in the face of faults: all windows and seals are doubled.

The cabin has sixteen round double-pane windows, positioned to provide a view of the horizon at all stages of flight. The windows are small compared to the gaps between them, but there are sufficiently many for human occupants to patch together a moderately good view.

The nose section can be removed, and there is also a hatch below the rear windows on the left side. Crew ingress and egress is possible by either route.

=== Spaceplane navigation ===
The core of the spacecraft avionics is the System Navigation Unit (SNU). Together with the Flight Director Display (FDD), it comprises the Flight Navigation Unit. The unit was developed jointly by Fundamental Technology Systems and Scaled Composites.

The SNU is a GPS-based inertial navigation system, which processes spacecraft sensor data and subsystem health data. It downlinks telemetry data by radio to mission control.

The FDD displays data from the SNU on a color LCD. It has several distinct display modes for different phases of flight, including the boost phase, coast, reentry, and gliding. The FDD is particularly important to the pilot during the boost and coast phase in order to "turn the corner" and null rates caused by asymmetric thrust. A mix of commercial and bespoke software is used in the FDD.

=== Hybrid rocket engine ===
Tier One uses a hybrid rocket engine supplied by SpaceDev, with solid hydroxyl-terminated polybutadiene (HTPB, or rubber) fuel and liquid nitrous oxide oxidizer. It generates 88 kN (20,000 lb_{f}) of thrust, and can burn for about 87 s (1.45 min).

The physical layout of the engine is novel. The oxidizer tank is a primary structural component, and is the only part of the engine that is structurally connected to the spacecraft: the tank is in fact an integral part of the spacecraft fuselage. The tank is a short cylinder of diameter approximately 1.52 m (5 ft 0 in), with domed ends, and is the forwardmost part of the engine. The fuel casing is a narrow cylinder cantilevered to the tank, pointing backwards. The cantilevered design means that a variety of motor sizes can be accommodated without changing the interface or other components. The nozzle is a simple extension of the fuel casing; the casing and nozzle are actually a single component, referred to as the CTN (case, throat, and nozzle). Burt Rutan has applied for a patent on this engine configuration.

There is considerable use of composite materials in the engine design. The oxidizer tank consists of a composite liner with graphite/epoxy over-wrap and titanium interface flanges. The CTN uses a high-temperature composite insulator with a graphite/epoxy structure. Incorporating the solid fuel (and hence the main part of the engine) and the ablative nozzle into this single bonded component minimizes the possible leak paths.

The oxidizer tank and CTN are bolted together at the main valve bulkhead, which is integrated into the tank. There are O-rings at the interface to prevent leakage; this is the main potential leak path in the engine. The ignition system, main control valve, and injector are mounted on the valve bulkhead, inside the tank. Slosh baffles are also mounted on this bulkhead. Because the oxidizer is stored under pressure, no pump is required.

The tank liner and the fuel casing are built in-house by Scaled Composites. The tank over-wrap is supplied by Thiokol. The ablative nozzle is supplied by AAE Aerospace. The oxidizer fill, vent, and dump system is supplied by Environmental Aeroscience Corporation. The remaining components—the ignition system, main control valve, injector, tank bulkheads, electronic controls, and solid fuel casting—are supplied by SpaceDev.

The CTN must be replaced between firings. This is the only part of the craft, other than the fuel and oxidizer themselves, that must be replaced.

The solid fuel is cast with four holes. This has the disadvantage that it is possible for chunks of fuel between the holes to become detached during a burn and obstruct the flow of oxidizer and exhaust. Such situations tend to rapidly self-correct.

The oxidizer tank is filled and vented through its forward bulkhead, on the opposite side of the tank from the fuel and the rest of the engine. This improves safety. It is filled to a pressure of 4.8 MPa (700 psi) at room temperature.

The nozzle has an expansion ratio of 25:1, which is optimized for the upper part of the atmosphere. A different nozzle, with an expansion ratio of 10:1, is used for test firing on the ground. The nozzles are black on the outside, but for aerodynamic testing, red dummy nozzles are used instead.

The rocket is not throttleable. Once lit, the burn can be aborted, but the power output cannot otherwise be controlled. The thrust in fact varies, for two reasons. Firstly, as the pressure in the oxidizer tank decreases, the flow rate reduces, reducing thrust. Secondly, in the late stages of a burn the oxidizer tank contains a mixture of liquid and gaseous oxidizer, and the power output of the engine varies greatly depending on whether it is using liquid or gaseous oxidizer at a particular moment. (The liquid, being far denser, allows a greater burn rate.)

Both the fuel and oxidizer can be stored without special precautions, and they do not burn when brought together without a significant source of heat. This makes the rocket far safer than conventional liquid or solid rockets. The combustion products are water vapour, carbon dioxide, hydrogen, nitrogen, nitrogen oxides and carbon monoxide.

The engine was upgraded in September 2004, between flights 15P and 16P. The upgrade increased the oxidizer tank size, to provide greater thrust in the early part of the burn, allow a longer burn, and delay the onset of the variable thrust phase at the end of the burn. Prior to the upgrade the engine generated 76 kN (17,000 lb_{f}) of thrust and could burn for 76 s (1.27 min). After the upgrade it was capable of 88 kN (20,000 lb_{f}) thrust and an 87 s (1.45 min) burn.

=== Launch aircraft ===
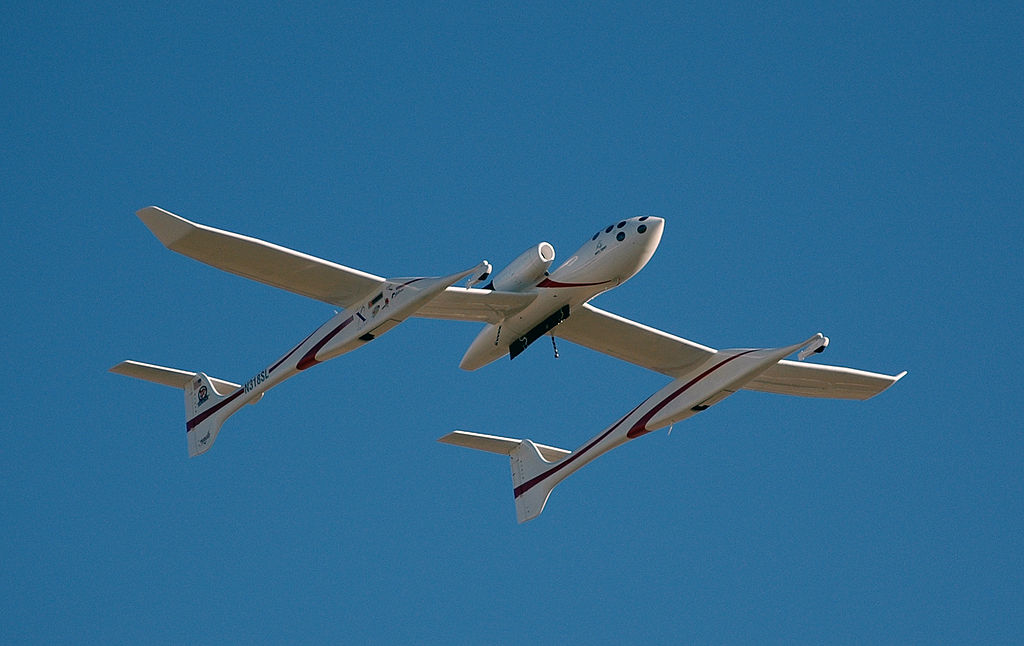
White Knight One launch aircraft

Tier One's launch aircraft, Scaled Composites Model 318, known as White Knight, is designed to take off and land horizontally and attain an altitude of about 15 km (9.3 mi), all while carrying the Tier One spacecraft in a parasite aircraft configuration. Its propulsion is by twin turbojets: afterburning J-85-GE-5 engines, rated at 15.6 kN (3,500 lb_{f}) of thrust each.

It has the same cabin, avionics, and trim system as SpaceShipOne. This means it can flight-qualify almost all components of SpaceShipOne. It also has a high thrust-to-weight ratio and large speed brakes. These features combined allow it to be used as a high-fidelity moving platform flight simulator for SpaceShipOne. White Knight is also equipped with a trim system which (when activated) causes it to have the same glide profile as SpaceShipOne; this allows the pilots to practice for landing SpaceShipOne. The same pilots fly White Knight as fly SpaceShipOne.

The aircraft's distinctive shape features long, thin wings, in a flattened "W" shape, with a wingspan of 25 m (82 ft), dual tailplanes, and four wheels (front and rear at each side). The rear wheels retract, but the front ones, which are steerable, are permanently deployed, with small fairings, referred to as "spats", in front. Another way to look at the overall shape is as two conventional planes, with very thin fuselages, side by side and joined at their wingtips, with the cockpit and engines mounted at the point of joining.

Although White Knight was developed for certain roles in the Tier One program, it is a very capable aircraft in its own right. Scaled Composites describe it as a "high-altitude research aircraft".

=== Flight profile ===
SpaceShipOne takes off from the ground, attached to White Knight in a parasite configuration, and under White Knight's power. The combination of SpaceShipOne and White Knight can take off, land, and fly under jet power to high altitude. A captive carry flight is one where the two craft land together without launching SpaceShipOne; this is one of the main abort modes available.

For launch, the combined craft flies to an altitude of around 14 km (8.7 mi), which takes about an hour. SpaceShipOne is then drop-released, and briefly glides unpowered. Rocket ignition may take place immediately, or may be delayed. If the rocket is never lit then SpaceShipOne can glide down to the ground. This is another major abort mode, in addition to being flown deliberately in glide tests.

The rocket engine is ignited while the spacecraft is gliding. Once under power, it is raised into a 65° climb, which is further steepened in the higher part of the trajectory. The maximum acceleration during ascent was recorded at 1.70G.

By the end of the burn the craft is flying upwards at some multiple of the speed of sound, up to about 900 m/s (3,000 ft/s) and Mach 3.5, and it continues to coast upwards unpowered (i.e. ballistically). If the burn was long enough then it will exceed an altitude of 100 km (62 mi), at which height the atmosphere presents no appreciable resistance, and the craft experiences free fall for a few minutes.

While at apogee the wings are reconfigured into high-drag mode. As the craft falls back it achieves high speeds comparable to those achieved on the way up; when it subsequently reenters the atmosphere it decelerates violently, up to 5.75G. At some altitude between 10 km (6.2 mi) and 20 km (12 mi) it reconfigures into low-drag glider mode, and glides down to a landing in about 20 minutes.

White Knight takes longer to descend, and typically lands a few minutes after SpaceShipOne.

== Specifications ==

Data from astronautix.com

General characteristics

- Crew: One
- Length: 27 ft 11 in (8.5 m)
- Wingspan: 26 ft 11 in (8.2 m)
- Diameter: 5 ft 0 in (1.52 m)
- Wing area: 160 sq ft (15 m^{2})
- Empty weight: 2,646 lb (1,200 kg)
- Gross weight: 7,937 lb (3,600 kg)
- Aspect Ratio: 1.6
- Powerplant: 1 × SpaceDev N_{2}O/HTPB hybrid rocket, 16,500 lbf (73.5 kN) thrust
- I_{sp}: 250 s (2.5 km/s)
- Burn time: 80 seconds

Performance

- Maximum speed: Mach 3.09 (2370 mph, 3815 km/h)
- Range: 40 mi (65 km, 35 nmi)
- Service ceiling: 367,000 ft (112,000 m)
- Rate of climb: 82,000 ft/min (420 m/s)
- Wing loading: 49 lb/sq ft (240 kg/m^{2})
- Thrust/weight: 2.08

== Development and winning the X Prize ==
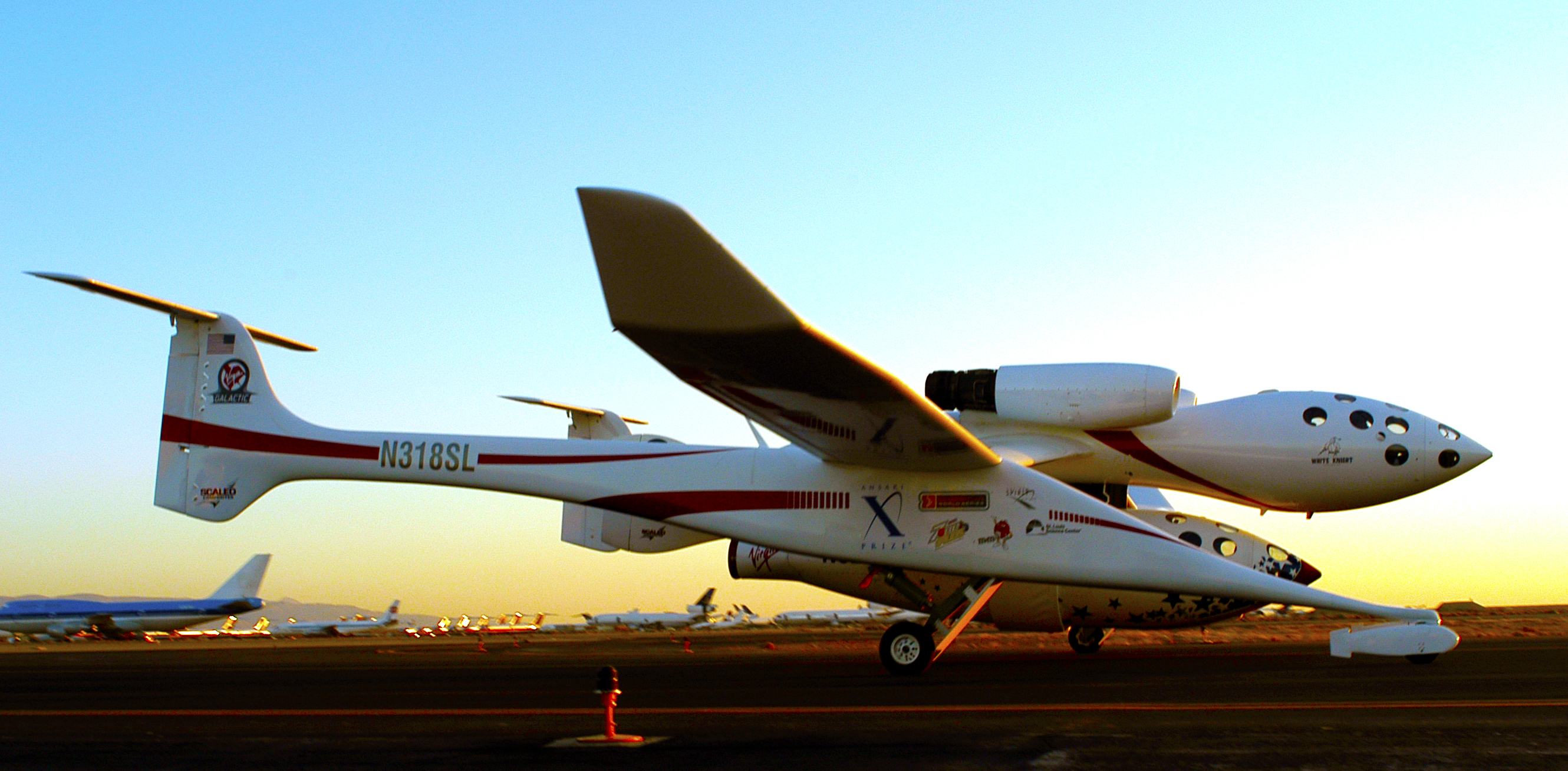
Flight 16P taxi pre launch

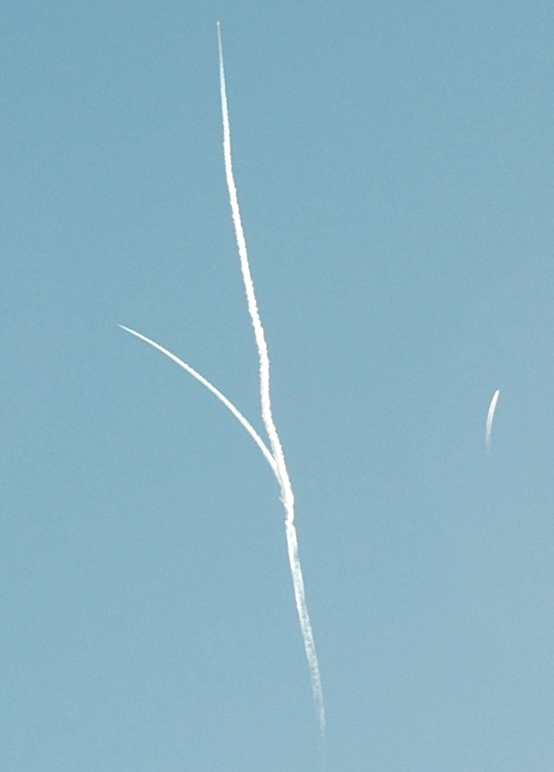
Launch of the rockets on SpaceShipOne

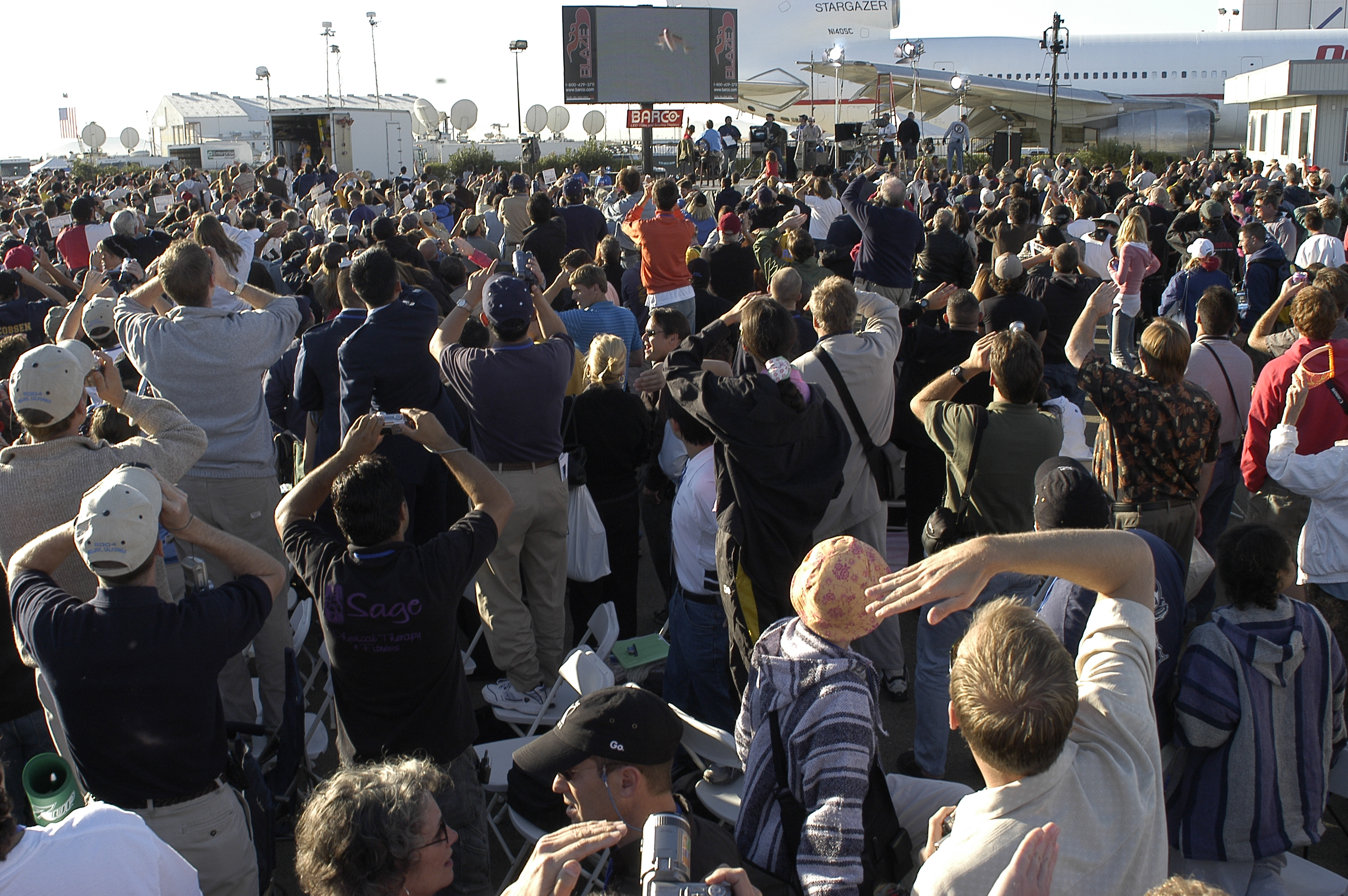
A crowd watches as SpaceShipOne makes its second flight

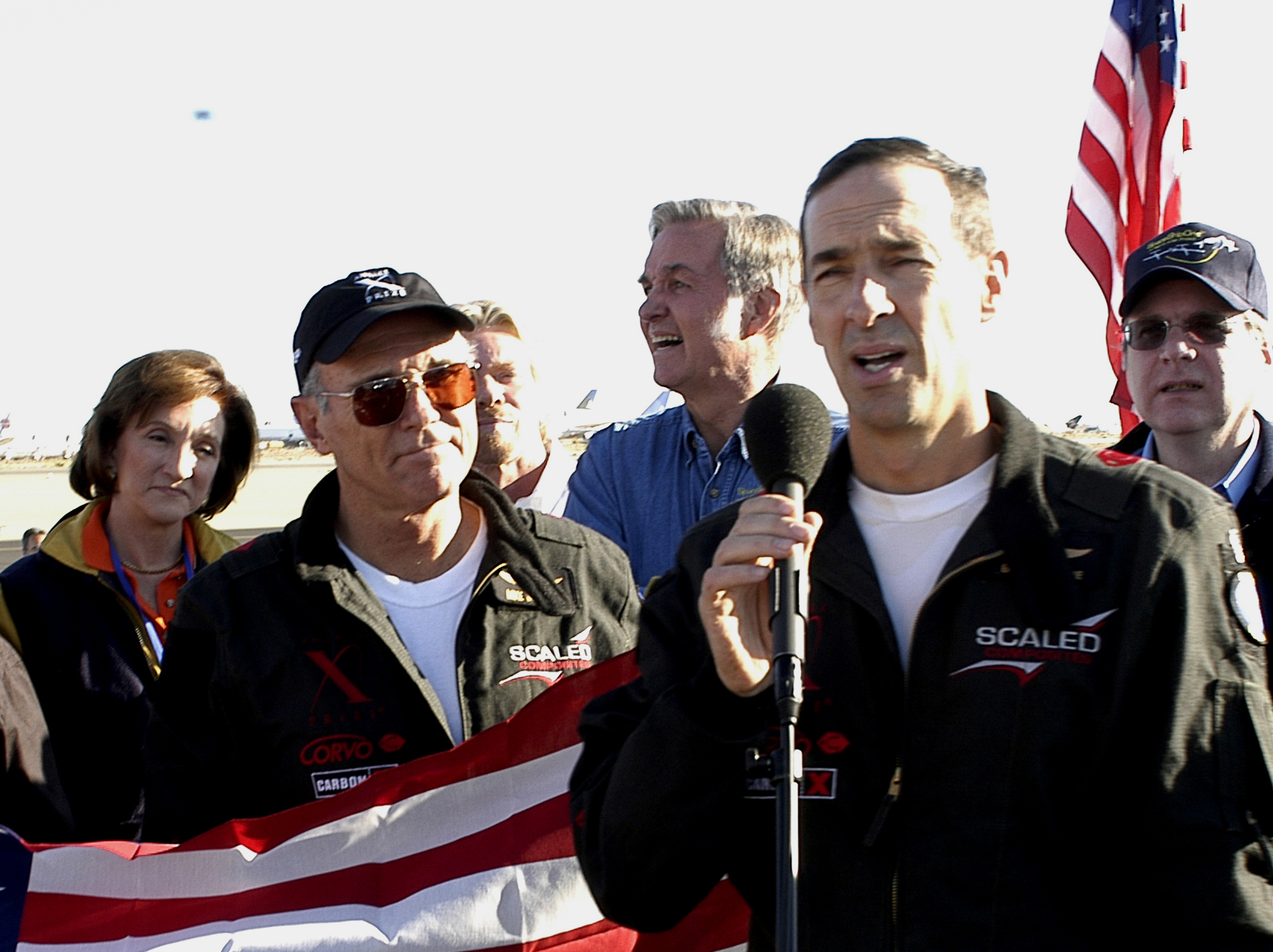
(L to R) Marion Blakely (FAA), Mike Melvill; Richard Branson, Burt Rutan, Brian Binnie, and Paul Allen reflect on a mission accomplished (October 4, 2004)

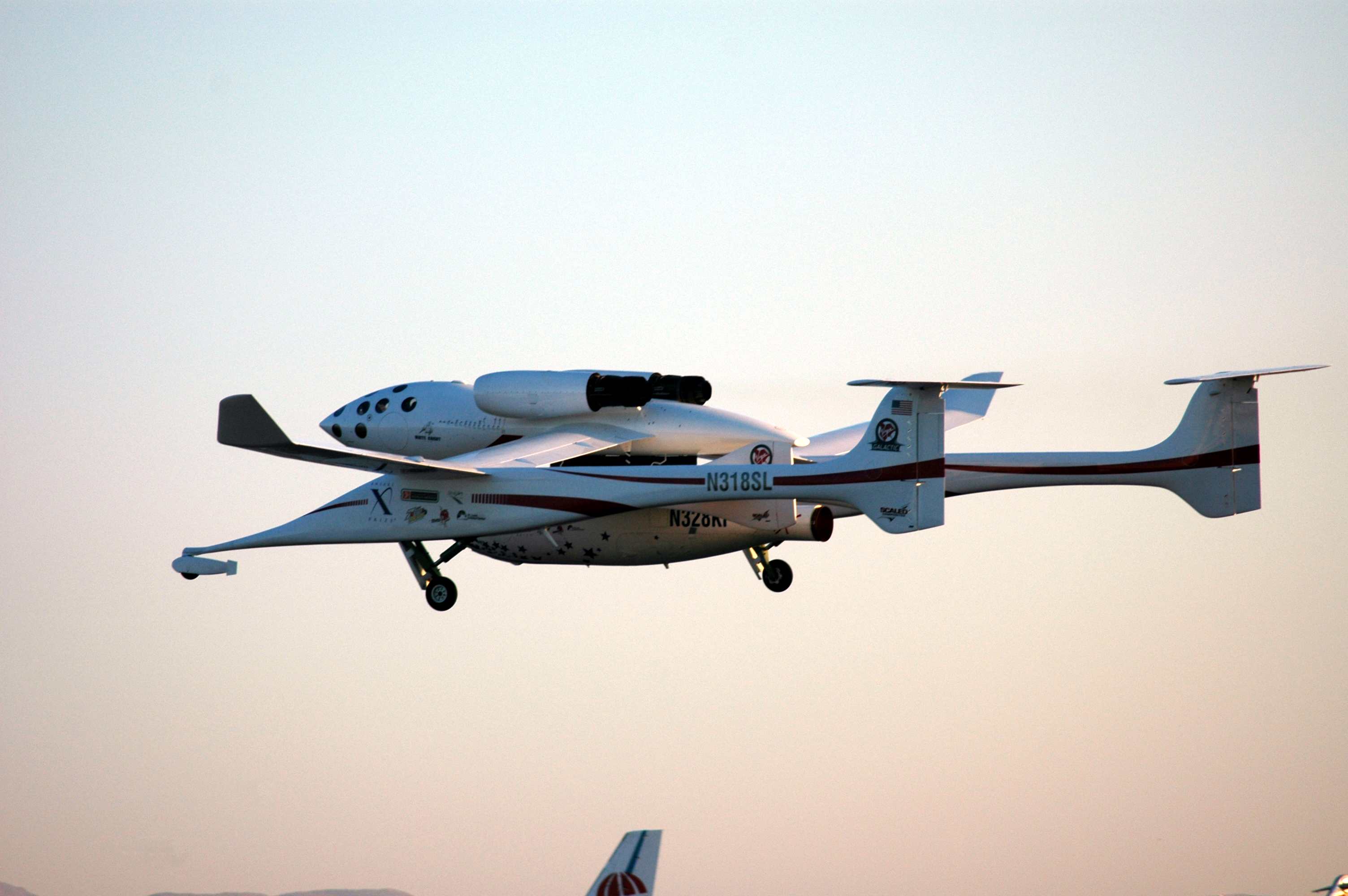
SpaceShipOne Flight Sept 2004

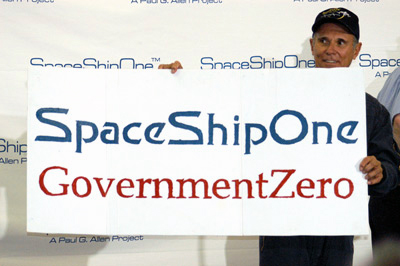
Mike Melvill SpaceShipOne Government Zero 15P

SpaceShipOne was developed by Mojave Aerospace Ventures (a joint venture between Paul Allen and Scaled Composites, Burt Rutan's aviation company, in their Tier One program), without government funding. On June 21, 2004, it made the first privately funded human spaceflight. On October 4, it won the US$10 million Ansari X Prize, by reaching 100 kilometers in altitude twice in a two-week period with the equivalent of three people on board and with no more than ten percent of the non-fuel weight of the spacecraft replaced between flights. Development costs were estimated to be US$25 million, funded completely by Paul Allen.

During its test program, SpaceShipOne set a number of important "firsts", including first privately funded aircraft to exceed Mach 2 and Mach 3, first privately funded crewed spacecraft to exceed 100km altitude, and first privately funded reusable crewed spacecraft.

SpaceShipOne was registered with the FAA as N328KF. N is the prefix for US-registered aircraft; 328KF was chosen by Scaled Composites to stand for 328 kilofeet (about 100 kilometers), the officially designated edge of space. The original choice of registry number, N100KM, was already taken. N328KF is registered as a glider, reflecting the fact that most of its independent flight is unpowered.

SpaceShipOne's first flight, 01C, was an uncrewed captive flight test on May 20, 2003. Glide tests followed, starting with flight 03G on August 7, 2003. Its first powered flight, flight 11P, was made on December 17, 2003, the 100th anniversary of the first powered flight.

On April 1, 2004, Scaled Composites received the first license for suborbital rocket flights to be issued by the US Office of Commercial Space Transportation. This license permitted the company to conduct powered test flights over the course of one year. On June 17, 2004, under the leadership of airport CEO Stuart O. Witt, Mojave Airport reclassified itself as the Mojave Air and Space Port.

Flight 15P on June 21, 2004, was SpaceShipOne's first spaceflight, and the first privately funded human spaceflight. There were a few control problems, but these were resolved prior to the Ansari X PRIZE flights that followed, with flight 17P to 112 km on October 4, 2004, winning the prize.

The SpaceShipOne Team was awarded the Space Achievement Award by the Space Foundation in 2005.

=== Flights ===
On 17 December 2003—on the 100th anniversary of the Wright brothers first powered flight of an aircraft—SpaceShipOne, piloted by Brian Binnie on Flight 11P, made its first rocket-powered flight and became the first privately built craft to achieve supersonic flight.

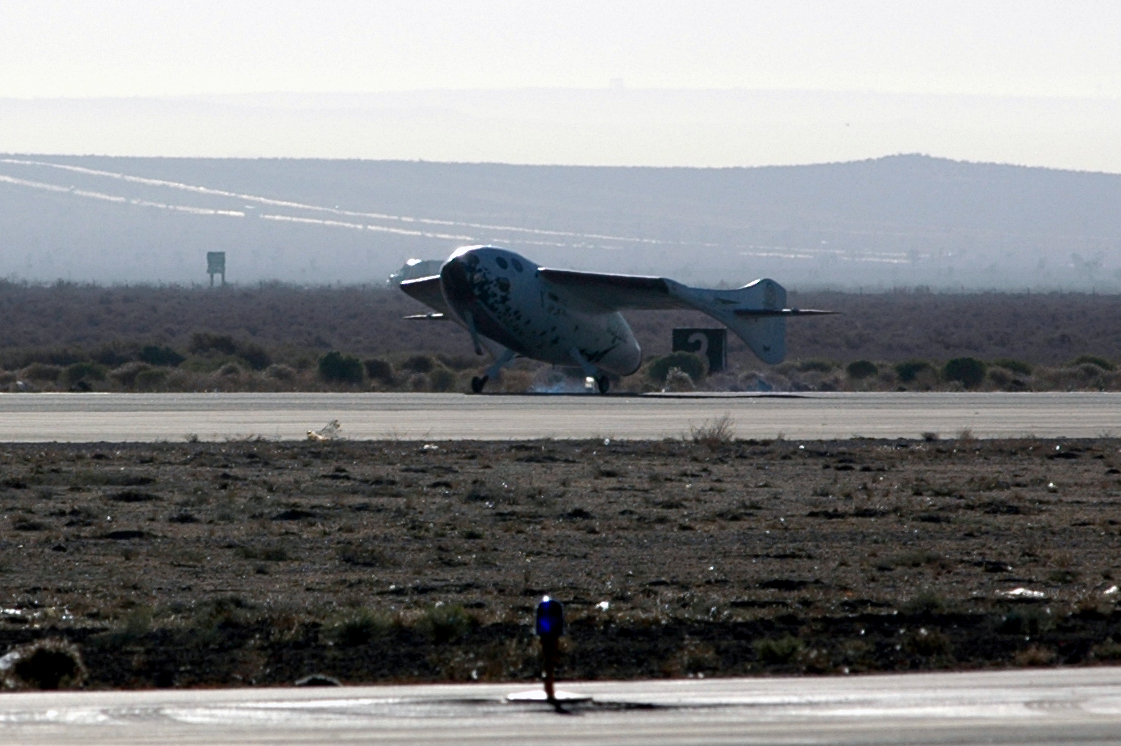
SpaceShipOne landing

All of the flights of SpaceShipOne were from the Mojave Airport Civilian Flight Test Center. Flights were numbered, starting with flight 01 on May 20, 2003. One or two letters are appended to the number to indicate the type of mission. An appended C indicates that the flight was a captive carry, G indicates an unpowered glide, and P indicates a powered flight. If the actual flight differs in category from the intended flight, two letters are appended: the first indicating the intended mission and the second the mission actually performed.

SpaceShipOne flights
Flight	Date	Top speed	Altitude	Duration	Pilot
01C	May 20, 2003		14.63 km	1 h 48 min	uncrewed
02C	July 29, 2003		14 km	2 h 06 min	Mike Melvill
03G	August 7, 2003	278 km/h	14.33 km	19 min 00 s	Mike Melvill
04GC	August 27, 2003	370 km/h	14 km	1 h 06 min	Mike Melvill
05G	August 27, 2003	370 km/h	14.69 km	10 min 30 s	Mike Melvill
06G	September 23, 2003	213 km/h	14.26 km	12 min 15 s	Mike Melvill
07G	October 17, 2003	241 km/h	14.08 km	17 min 49 s	Mike Melvill
08G	November 14, 2003	213 km/h	14.42 km	19 min 55 s	Peter Siebold
09G	November 19, 2003	213 km/h	14.72 km	12 min 25 s	Mike Melvill
10G	December 4, 2003	213 km/h	14.75 km	13 min 14 s	Brian Binnie
11P	December 17, 2003	Mach 1.2	20.67 km	18 min 10 s	Brian Binnie
12G	March 11, 2004	232 km/h	14.78 km	18 min 30 s	Peter Siebold
13P	April 8, 2004	Mach 1.6	32.00 km	16 min 27 s	Peter Siebold
14P	May 13, 2004	Mach 2.5	64.43 km	20 min 44 s	Mike Melvill
15P	June 21, 2004	Mach 2.9	100.124 km	24 min 05 s	Mike Melvill
16P	September 29, 2004	Mach 2.92	102.93 km	24 min 11 s	Mike Melvill
17P	October 4, 2004	Mach 3.09	112.014 km	23 min 56 s	Brian Binnie

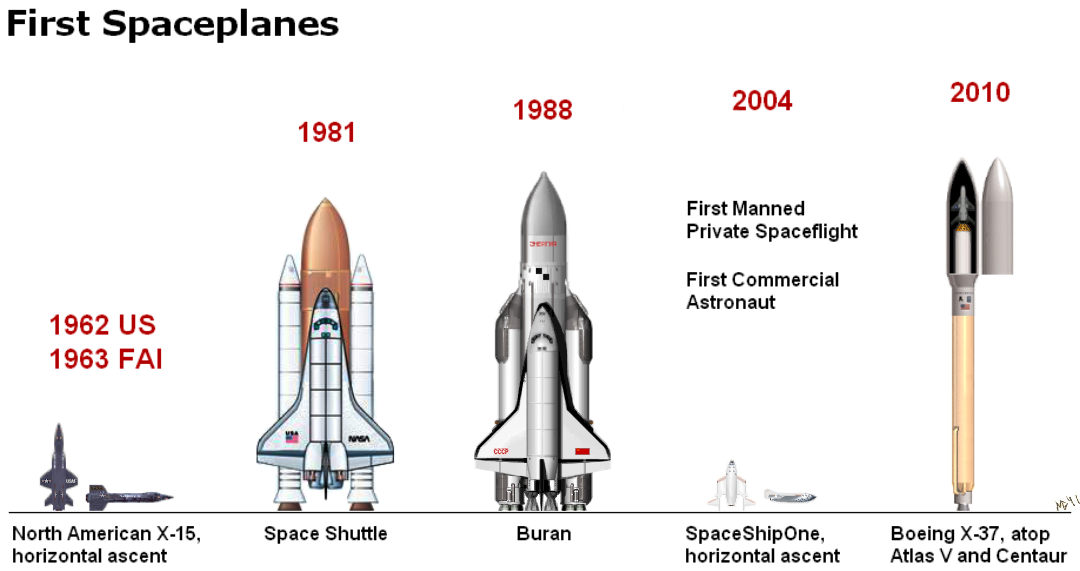
SpaceShipOne ranks among the world's first spaceplanes in the first 50 years of human spaceflight, with the North American X-15, Space Shuttle, Buran, and Boeing X-37. SpaceShipOne is the second spaceplane to have launched from a mother ship, preceded only by the North American X-15.

The flights were accompanied by two chase planes—an Extra 300 owned and flown by Chuck Coleman, and a Beechcraft Starship.

=== Astronauts ===
The SpaceShipOne pilots came from a variety of aerospace backgrounds. Mike Melvill was a test pilot, Brian Binnie was a former Navy pilot, and Peter Siebold is an engineer at Scaled Composites. They qualified to fly SpaceShipOne by training on the Tier One flight simulator and in White Knight and other Scaled Composites aircraft.

== Retirement ==
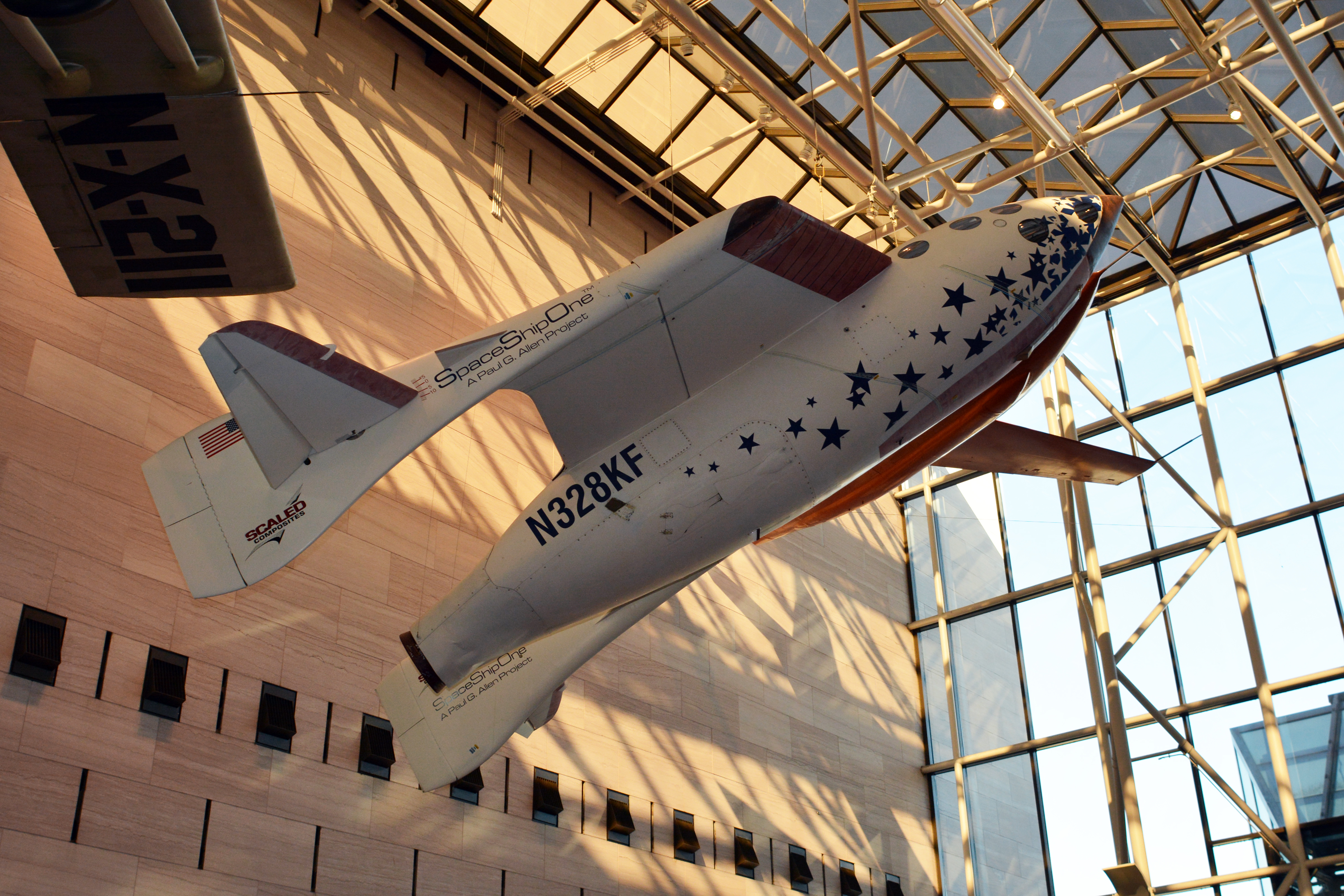
SpaceShipOne now hangs in the National Air and Space Museum in Washington, D.C.

SpaceShipOne's space flights were watched by large crowds at Mojave Spaceport. A fourth suborbital flight, Flight 18P, was originally scheduled for October 13, 2004. However, Burt Rutan decided not to risk damage to the historic craft, and cancelled it and all future flights.

On July 25, 2005, SpaceShipOne was taken to the Oshkosh Airshow in Oshkosh, Wisconsin. After the airshow, Mike Melvill and crew flew the White Knight, carrying SpaceShipOne, to Wright-Patterson Air Force Base in Dayton, Ohio, where Melvill spoke to a group of about 300 military and civilian personnel. Later in the evening, Melvill gave a presentation at the Dayton Engineers Club, entitled "Some Experiments in Space Flight", in honor of Wilbur Wright's now-famous presentation to the American Society of Mechanical Engineers in 1901 entitled "Some Experiments in Flight". The White Knight then transported SpaceShipOne to the Smithsonian Institution's National Air and Space Museum to be put on display. It was unveiled on Wednesday October 5, 2005 in the Milestones of Flight gallery and is now on display to the public in the main atrium with the Spirit of St. Louis, the Bell X-1, and the Apollo 11 command module Columbia.

Commander Brian Binnie donated the flight suit and checklist used during his Ansari X Prize-winning flight to an auction benefitting Seattle's Museum of Flight. Entertainer and fundraising auctioneer Fred Northup Jr. purchased the flight suit and checklist book, and the flight suit is on display at the museum's Charles Simonyi Space Gallery.

A piece of SpaceShipOne's carbon fiber material was launched aboard the New Horizons mission to Pluto in 2006.

== Replicas ==
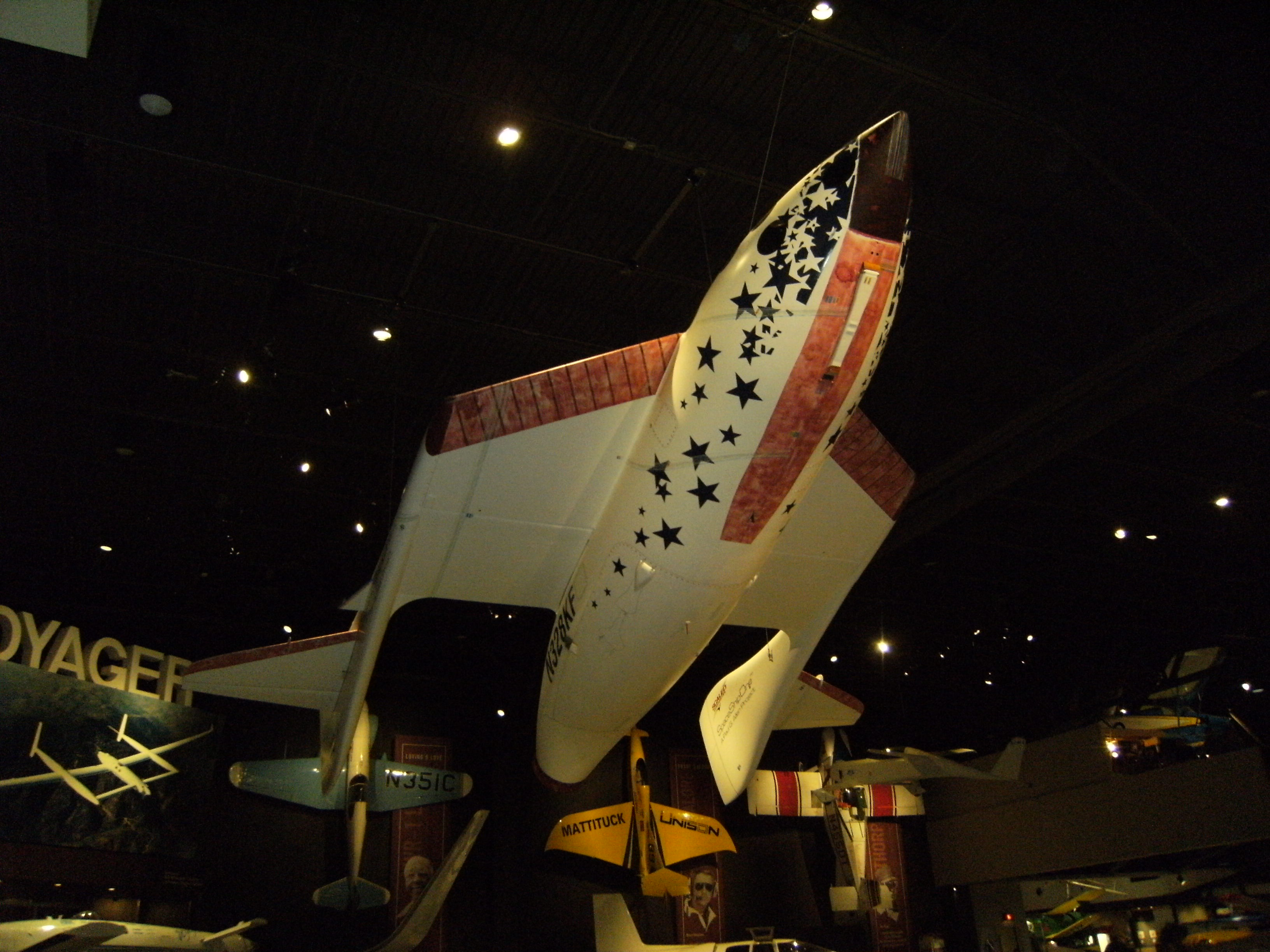
Normal configuration

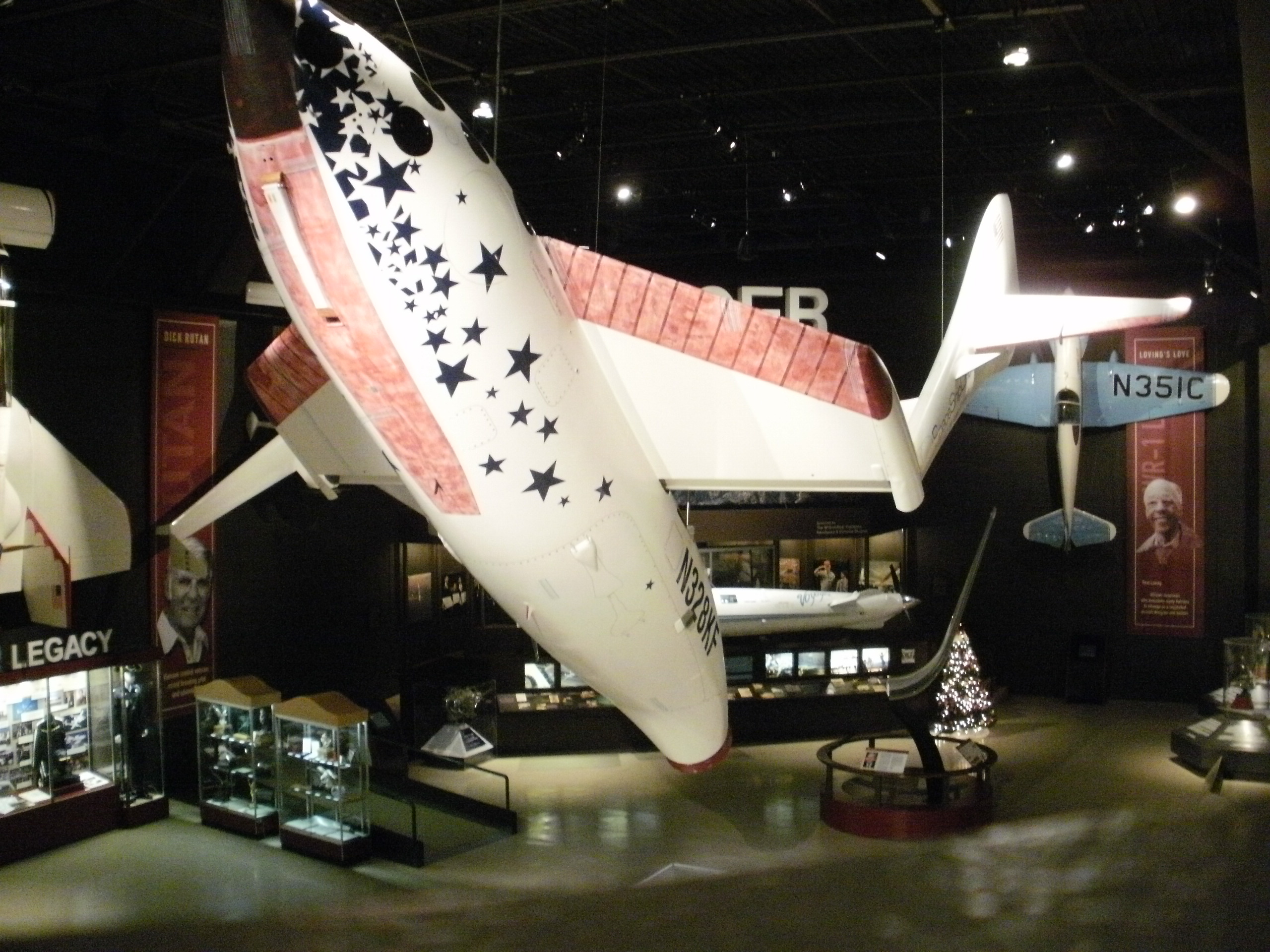
Feathered configuration

EAA replica in both feathered and normal configuration.

A year after its appearance in the Oshkosh Airventure airshow, the Experimental Aircraft Association featured a full-scale replica of the spacecraft in a wing of its museum which housed other creations of Burt Rutan. Using the same fiberglass molds as the original, it was so exact in its replication—despite not having any doors or interior—that it was dubbed "Serial 2 Scaled" by Scaled Composites. Each detail in its appearance was matched, down to the N328KF registration number on its fuselage. It is so precise that, during a 7-minute video presentation held every hour on the half hour in the museum, it can display the two different modes of its 'feathering' ability, albeit through the aid of pulleys and wires (there is no machinery in the replica).

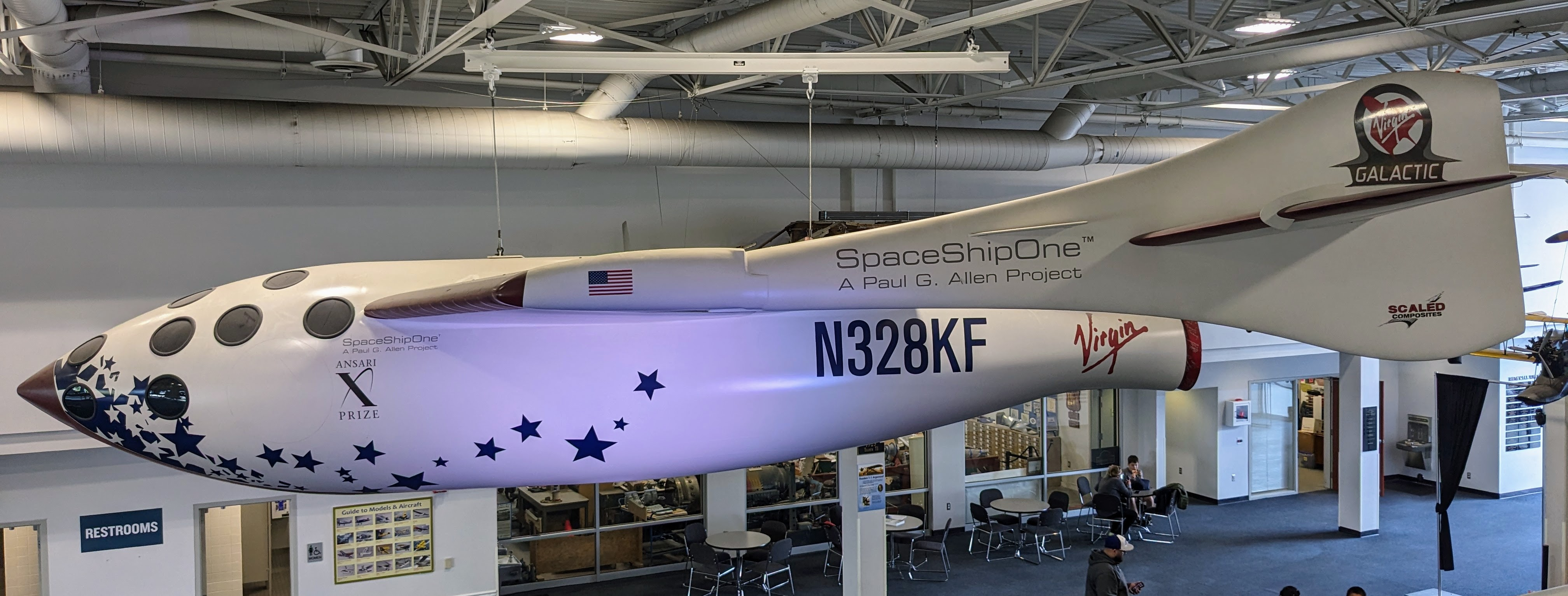
Replica of SpaceShipOne at Hiller Aviation Museum

Locations of other full-scale replicas:

- William Thomas Terminal at Meadows Field Airport in Bakersfield
- Mojave Spaceport's Legacy Park alongside the original Roton Atmospheric Test Vehicle
- Flying Heritage Collection at Paine Field in Everett
- Hiller Aviation Museum at San Carlos Airport (California)
- Google's Mountain View Campus
- Frontiers of Flight Museum, Dallas Love Field, Dallas, Texas.

SpaceShipOne was also made into a model rocket in 2004.

== Subsequent spacecraft ==
With the success of Tier One meeting its project goals, a successor project started in 2004 was Tier 1b. The successor ships are named SpaceShipTwo and White Knight Two. The name of the joint venture between Virgin Group and Scaled Composites is called The Spaceship Company, with a goal of carrying passengers under the name Virgin Galactic, a spaceliner with an initial target of a commercial fleet of five spacecraft.

In August 2005, Virgin Galactic stated that if the upcoming suborbital service with SpaceShipTwo would be successful, the follow-up would be known as SpaceShipThree.

On 13 December 2018, VSS Unity achieved the SpaceShipTwo project's first suborbital space flight, VSS Unity VP-03, with two pilots, reaching an altitude of 82.7 kilometres (51.4 mi), and officially entering outer space by US standards.

== Gallery ==
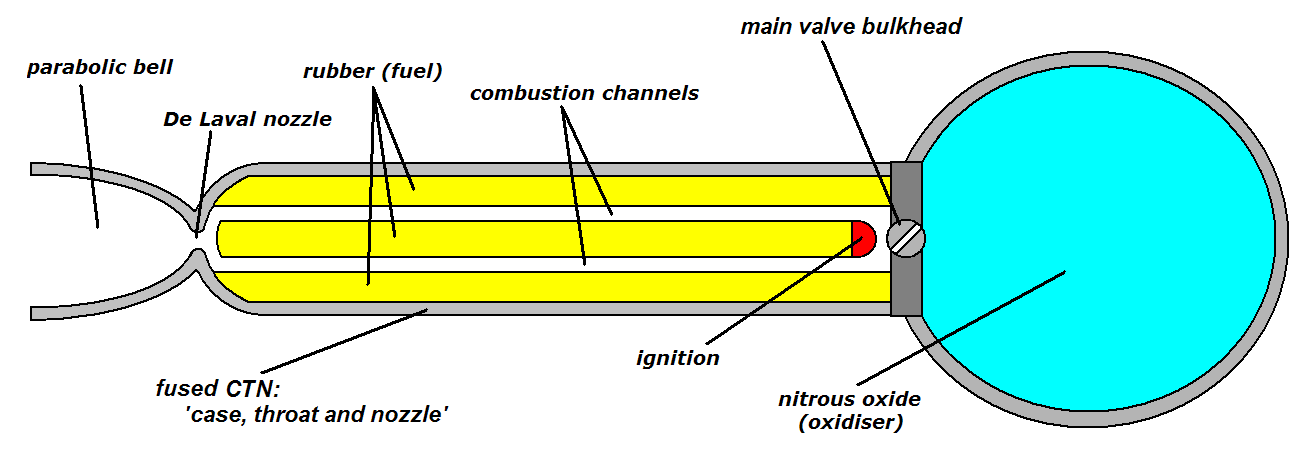
Hybrid rocket engine detail of SpaceShipOne (more information).

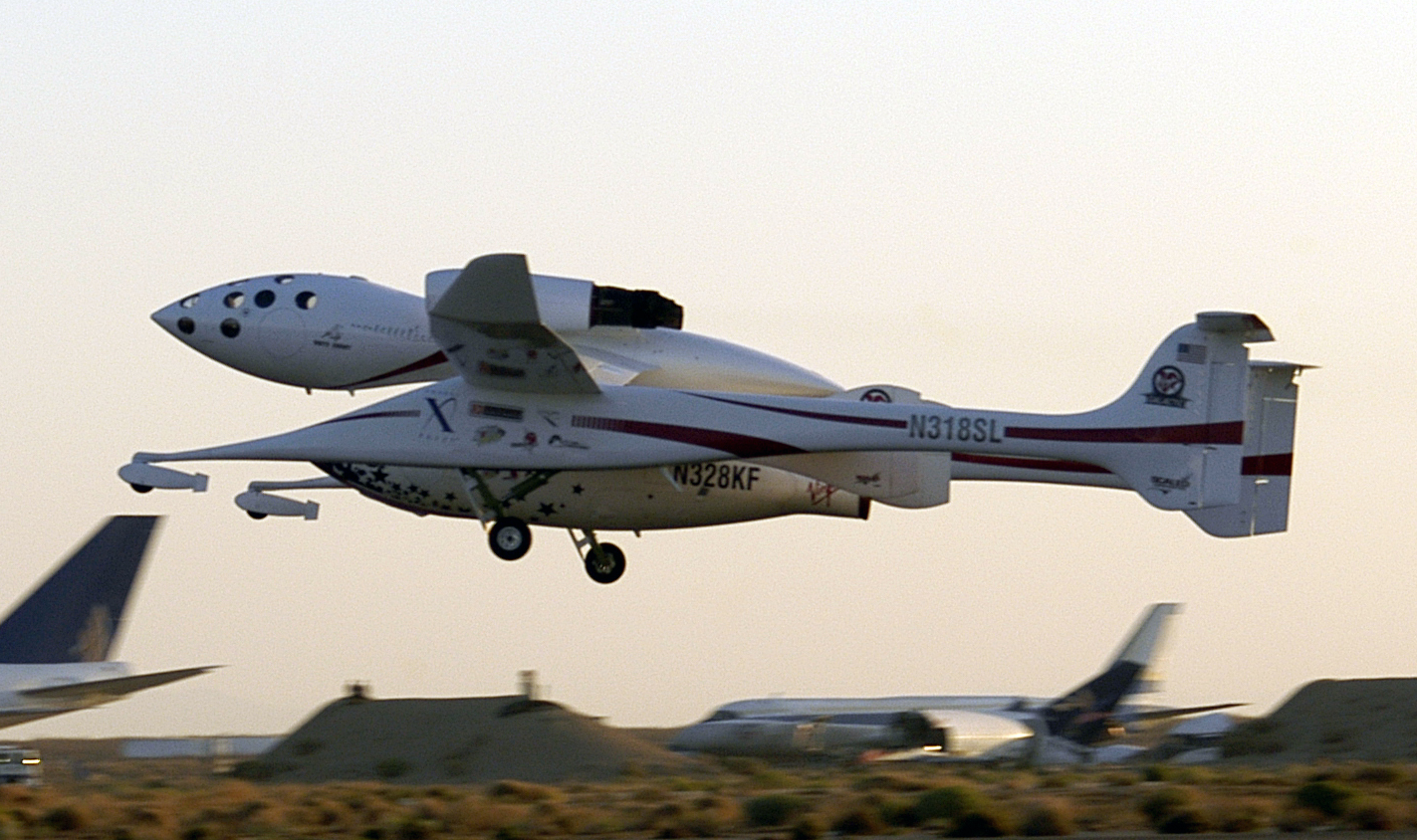
SpaceShipOne takes off

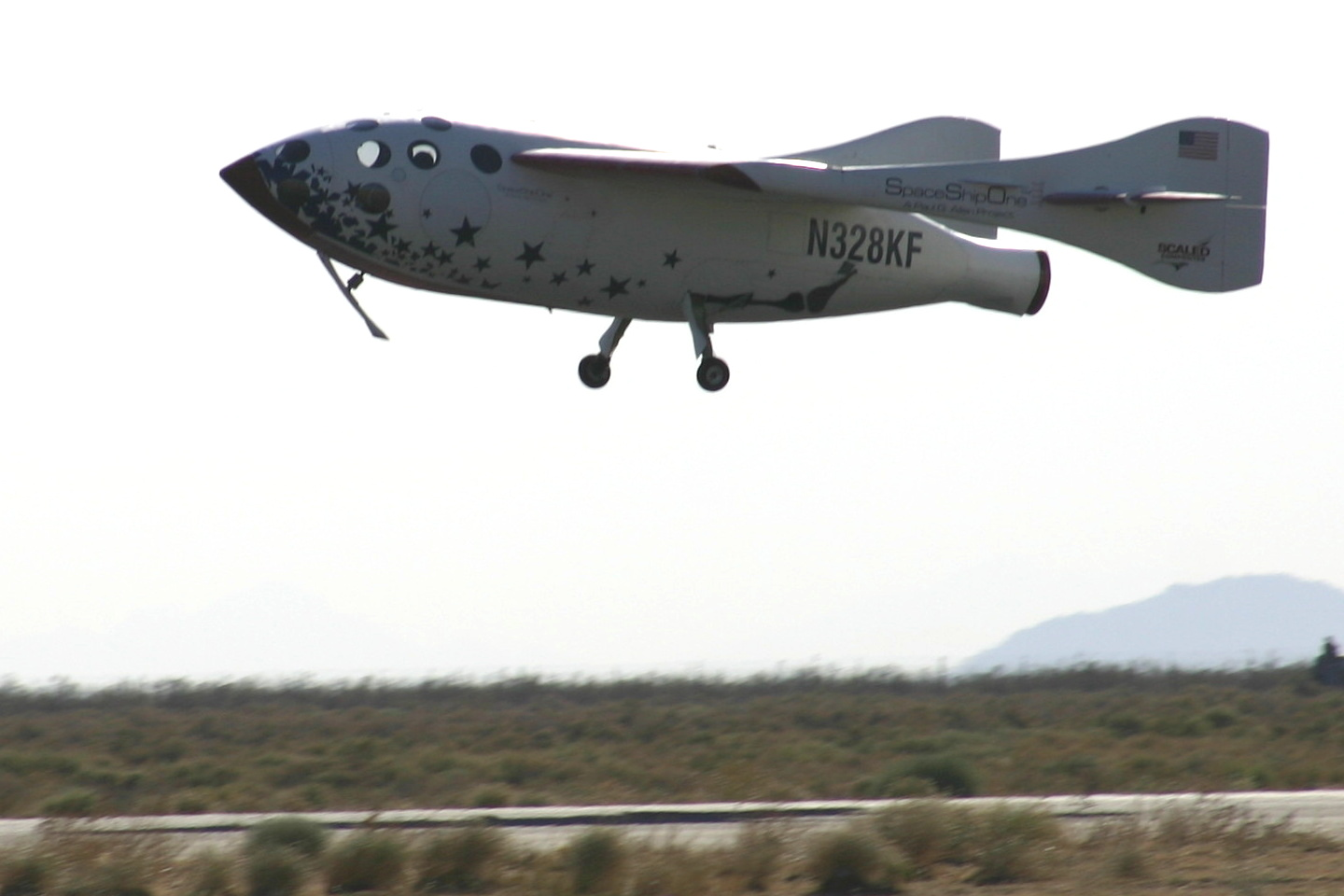
SpaceShipOne landing after its June 21, 2004 space flight (Flight 15P)

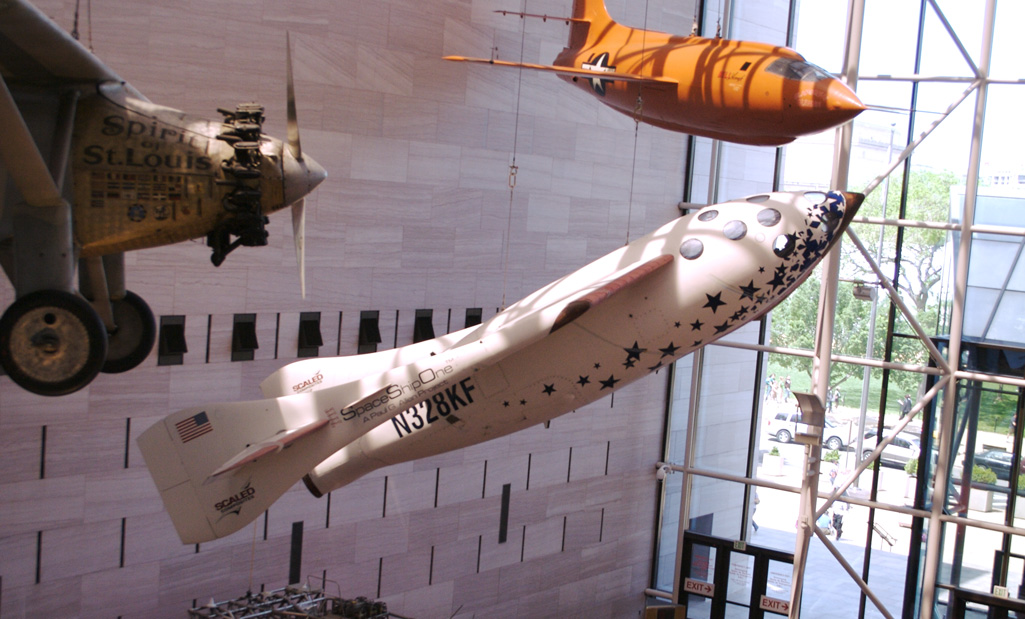
SpaceShipOne in the National Air and Space Museum in Washington D.C., with the Spirit of Saint Louis and Bell X-1 Glamorous Glennis

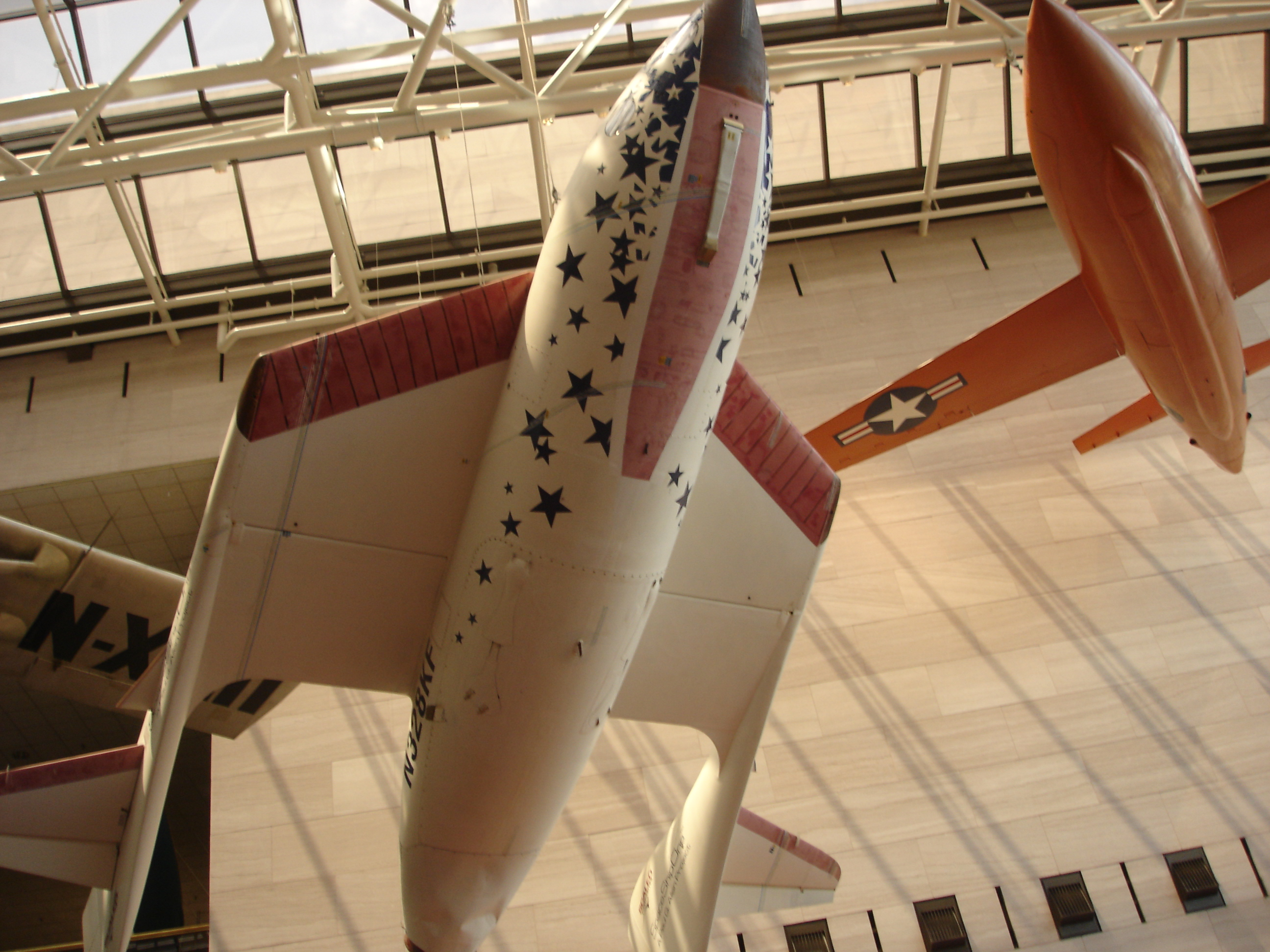

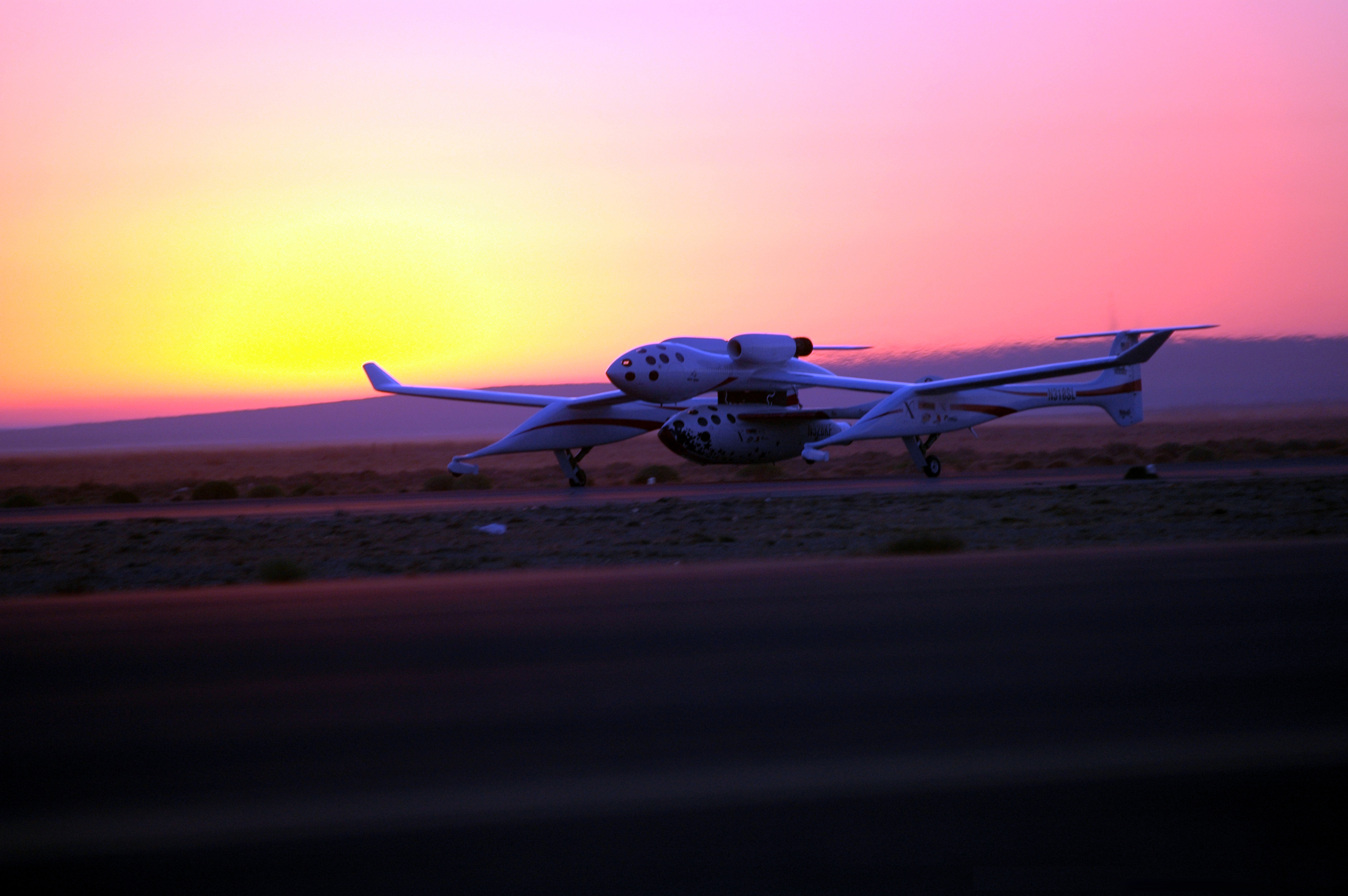
SpaceShipOne taking off

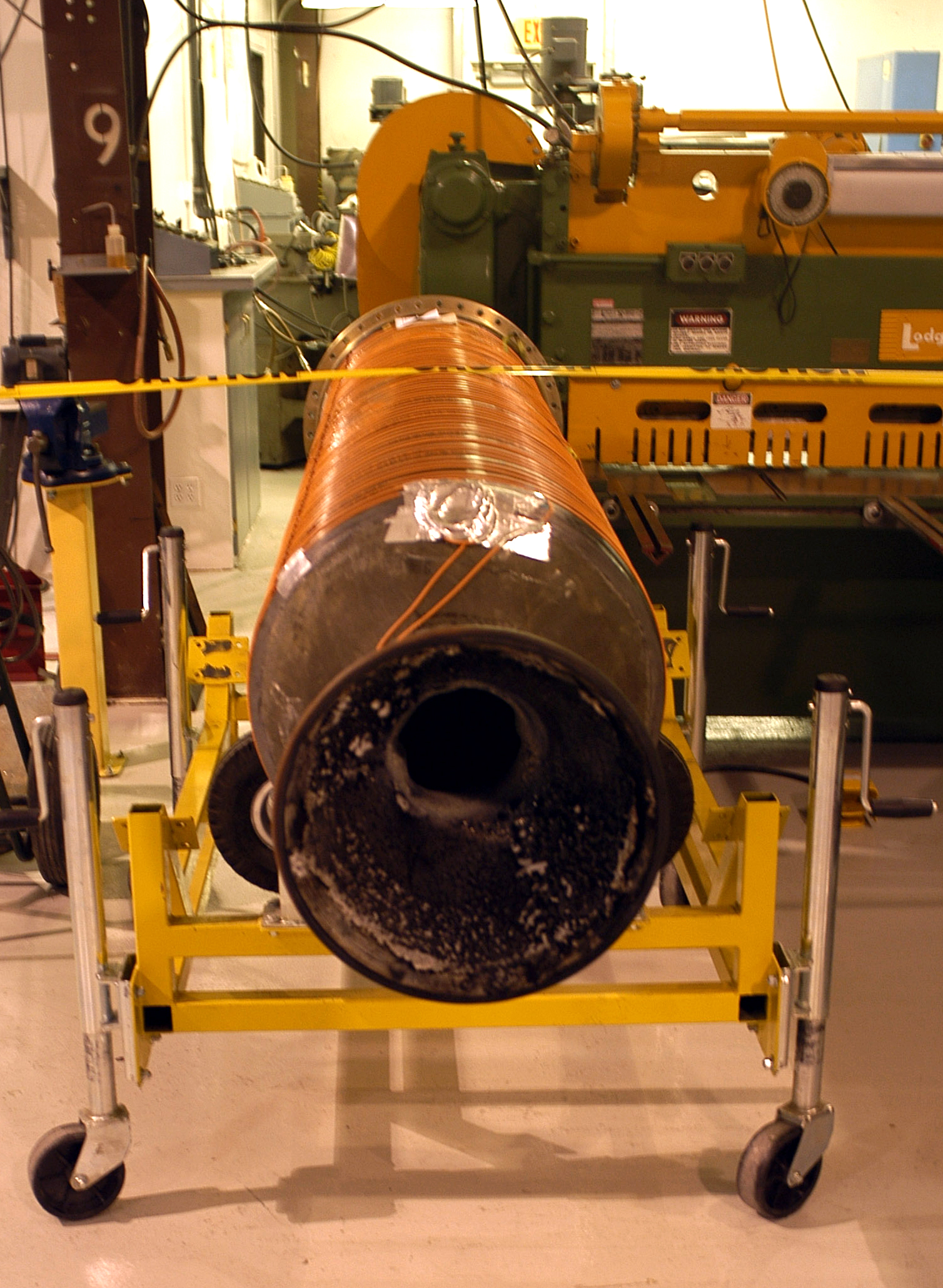
Exhausted SS1 rocket engine in the Scaled Composites building

Timeline of sub-orbital flights

== See also ==
- 2004 in spaceflight
- Black Sky: The Race For Space, 2005 documentary about SpaceShipOne
- X-15
- SpaceShipTwo
- FAST20XX ALPHA vehicle based on SpaceShipOne
