= Galactic 07 =

2024 private crewed suborbital spaceflight

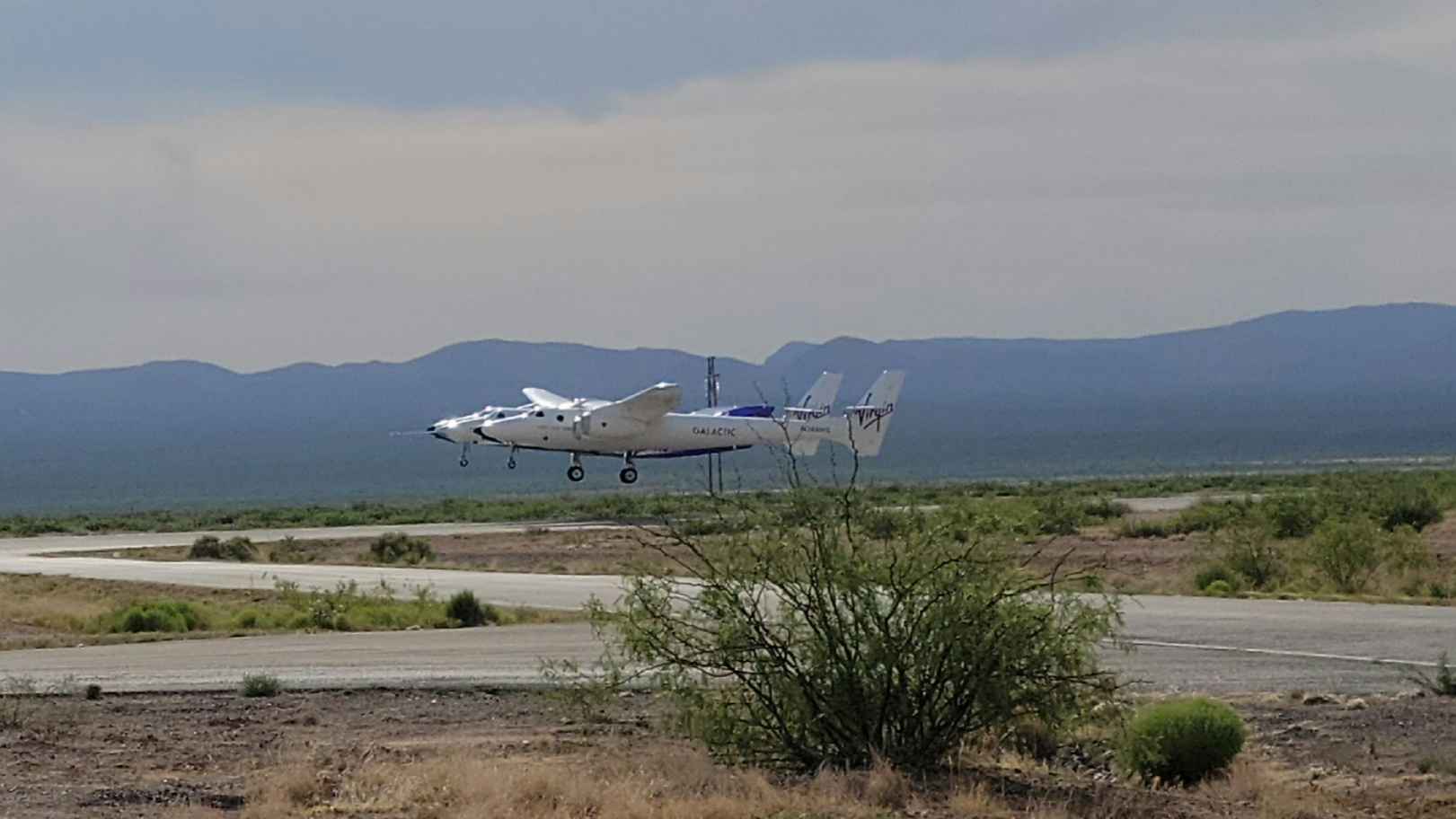
- Takeoff of Galactic 07 with WhiteKnightTwo and VSS Unity
- Mission type: Crewed sub-orbital spaceflight
- Operator: Virgin Galactic
- Mission duration: 14 min and 30 second
- Apogee: 87.5 km (54.4 mi)

Spacecraft properties
- Spacecraft: VSS Unity
- Spacecraft type: SpaceShipTwo
- Manufacturer: The Spaceship Company

Crew
- Crew size: 6
- Members: Nicola Pecile; Jameel Janjua; Tuva Cihangir Atasever; Giorgio Manenti; Irving Pergament; Andy Sadhwani

Start of mission
- Launch date: 8 June 2024, 15:26:30 UTC
- Launch site: Spaceport America Runway 34
- Deployed from: VMS Eve

End of mission
- Landing date: 8 June 2024, 15:41 UTC
- Landing site: Spaceport America Runway 34
- Galactic 7 mission patch VSS Unity spaceflights

Galactic 07 was a crewed sub-orbital spaceflight of the SpaceShipTwo-class VSS Unity, which launched on 8 June 2024. It was the final launch of Unity.

It was the seventh commercial spaceflight and twelfth overall spaceflight for American aerospace company Virgin Galactic.

== Crew ==
Galactic 07's crew included four private passengers and two Virgin Galactic employees.

Position	Crew
Commander	(Italy) Nicola Pecile; Fourth spaceflight
Pilot	(Canada) Jameel Janjua; First spaceflight
Researcher	(Turkey) Tuva Cihangir Atasever; First spaceflight
Tourist	(United States) (India) Andy Sadhwani; First spaceflight
Tourist	(United States) (Israel) Irving (Yitzhak) Pergament; First spaceflight
Tourist	(Italy) Giorgio Manenti; First spaceflight

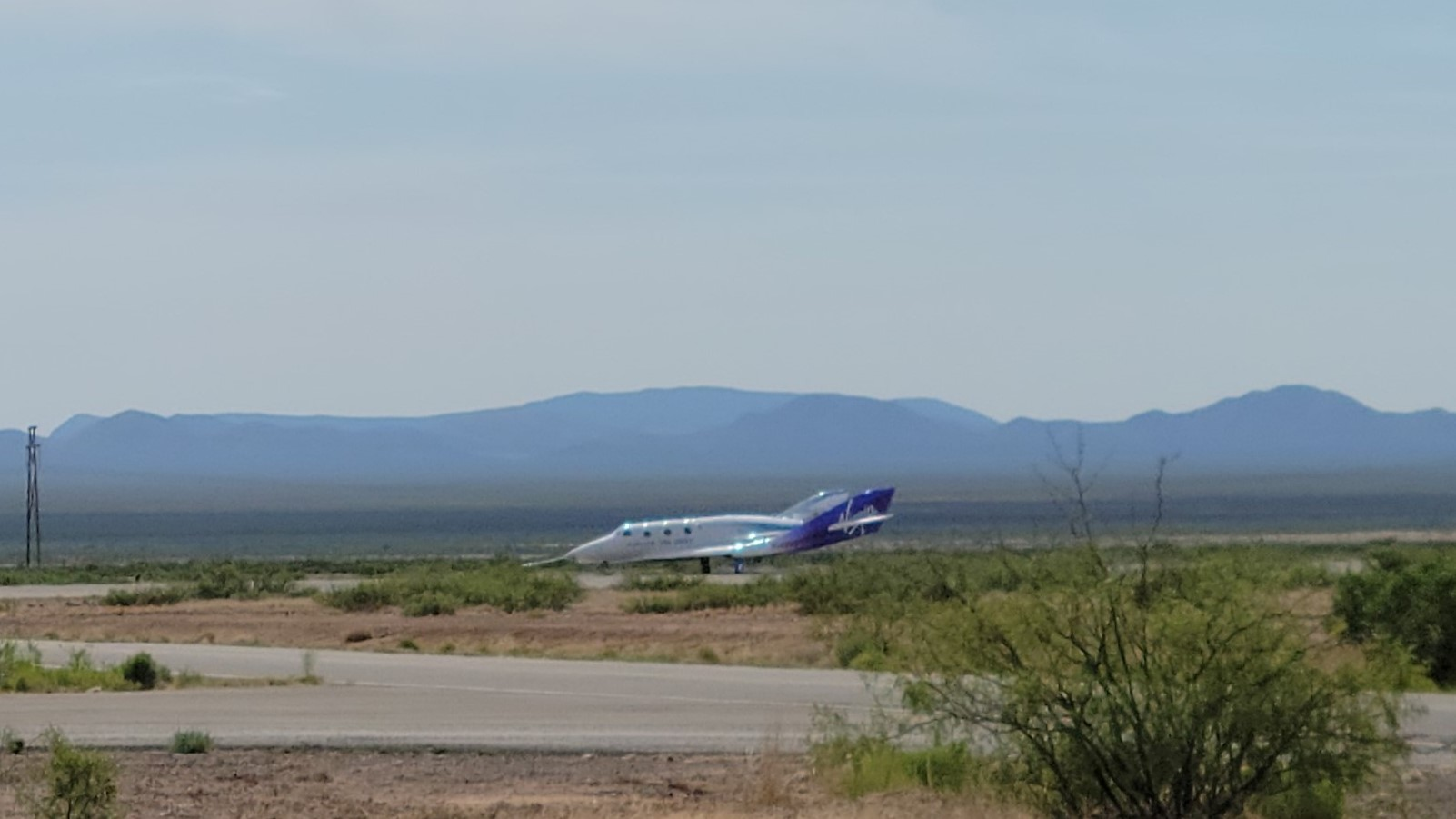
VSS Unity landing during Galactic 07

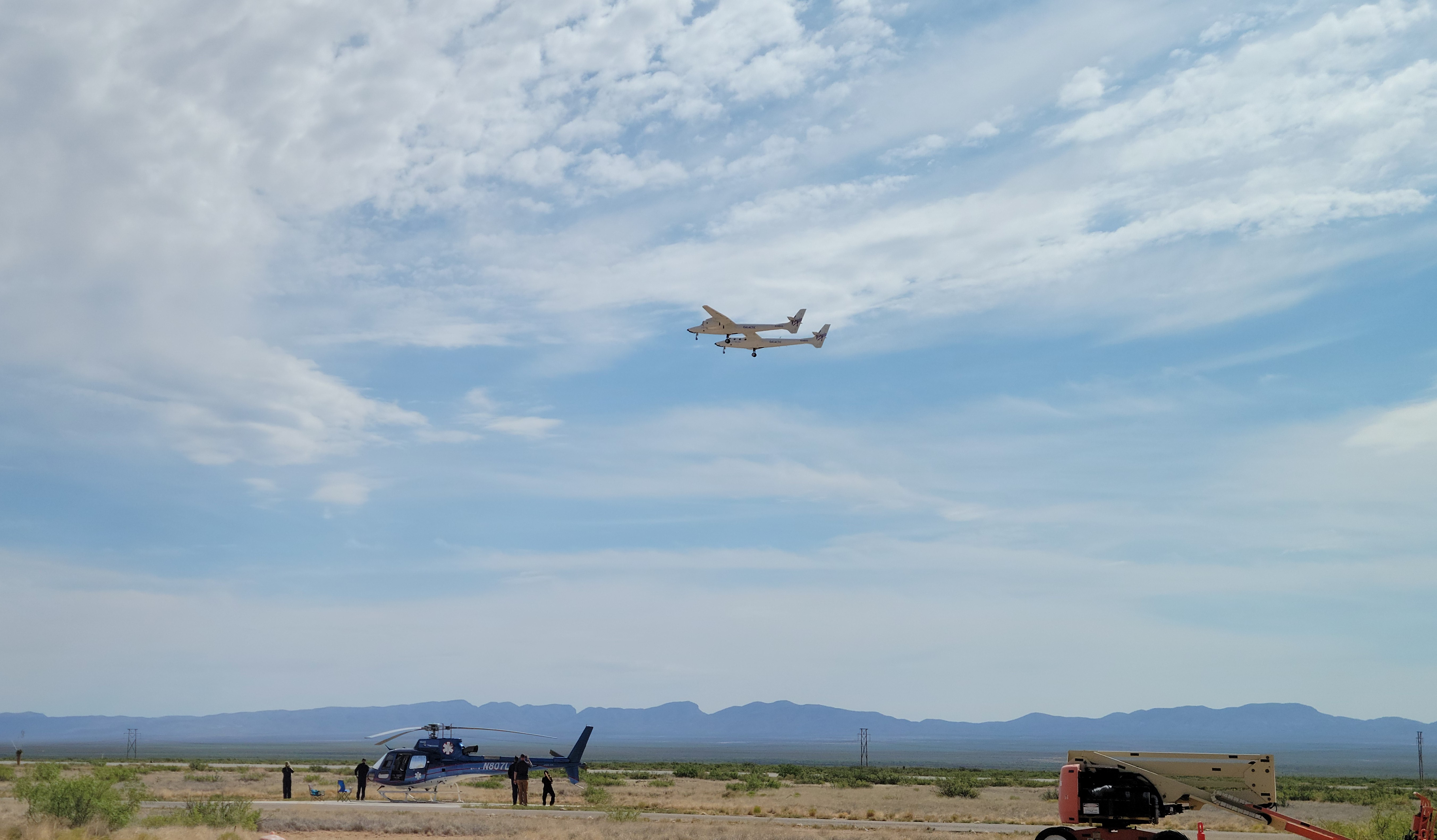
WhiteKnightTwo after Galactic 07
