= Steve Isakowitz =

American businessman (born c. 1961)

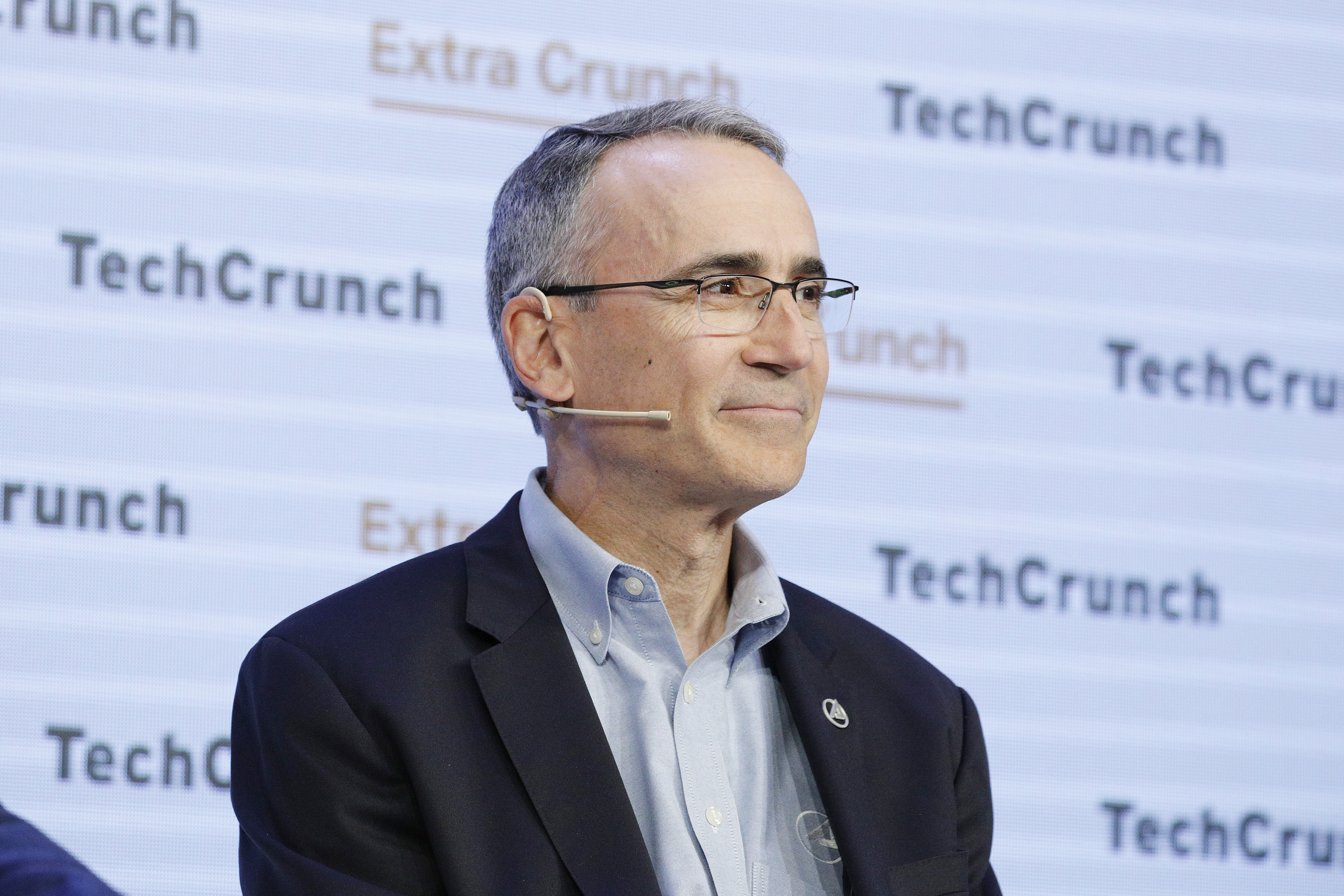
Steve Isakowitz (2019)

Steve Isakowitz (born c. 1961) is a former president and CEO of The Aerospace Corporation, having served in the position from October 1, 2016 until being succeeded by Tanya Pemberton on October 18, 2025. The Aerospace Corporation is a leading architect for the nation's national security and civil space programs with more than 4,000 employees and annual revenues of $1.1 billion. Isakowitz is a recognized leader across the government, private, space, and technology sectors, having served in prominent roles at Virgin Galactic, the U.S. Department of Energy, NASA, and the White House Office of Management and Budget. He is the co-author of the AIAA International Reference Guide to Space Launch Systems, which received the Summerfield Book Award in 2003.

== Early life and education ==
Isakowitz was born in Cleveland, Ohio. He is a devoted Cleveland Browns fan. He earned his bachelor's and master's degrees in aerospace engineering from the Massachusetts Institute of Technology.

== Career ==
Isakowitz became president and CEO of Aerospace Corp. in 2016, leaving the post of President at Virgin Galactic, where he was replaced by Mike Moses.

Prior to Aerospace Corp, Isakowitz was President of Virgin Galactic from 2013 to 2016. He served as Chief Technology Officer of Virgin Galactic from 2011 to 2013. At Virgin Galactic, his responsibilities included the development of privately funded launch systems, human spaceflight vehicles, advanced technologies, and other new space applications.

Prior to Virgin Galactic, Isakowitz served as Chief Financial Officer of the United States Department of Energy, where he supported basic scientific research and advanced energy technologies in the national security and civil sectors, while managing a budget of nearly $30 billion. In 2007, he was appointed as the United States Department of Energy Chief Financial Officer by President George W. Bush where he was confirmed to his post unanimously by the U.S. Senate. He was selected to continue in his position under President Barack Obama.

Previously, he served as Deputy Associate Administrator for the Exploration Systems Mission Directorate at NASA, where he helped guide the development of advanced technologies and promoted innovative approaches in the areas of space transportation and government-industry partnerships.

Prior to his NASA work, Isakowitz served as Science and Space Programs Branch Chief at the White House Office of Management and Budget, where he oversaw $50 billion in federal science and technology programs, which included NASA, NOAA, and the National Science Foundation.

Together with Sirisha Bandla, Isakowitz and his wife founded the non-profit Matthew Isakowitz Foundation in 2017 in honor of his late son.

Isakowitz joined Vast as an advisor in June of 2026.

== Awards and affiliations ==
Isakowitz has received numerous awards and citations, among them NASA's Outstanding Leadership Medal and the Presidential Distinguished Rank Award. Isakowitz serves on various advisory boards at both the Massachusetts Institute of Technology and California State University, Long Beach, and has served on the FAA's Commercial Space Transportation Advisory Committee.
