= SpaceShip III =

Cancelled class of spaceplanes by Virgin Galactic

- Manufacturer: The Spaceship Company
- Country of origin: United States
- Operator: Virgin Galactic
- Applications: Suborbital space tourism

Specifications
- Spacecraft type: Crewed spaceplane
- Crew capacity: 8 (planned)
- Regime: Suborbital

Capacity

Payload to Suborbital

Production
- Status: Cancelled

Related spacecraft
- Derived from: SpaceShipTwo
- Derivatives: Delta Class

Engine details
- Powered by: 1 hybrid rocket engine

SpaceShip III (SS3, also with Roman numeral: SSIII; formerly SpaceShipThree) was a planned class of spaceplanes by Virgin Galactic to follow SpaceShipTwo. It was first teased on the Virgin Galactic Twitter account on 25 February 2021 announcing the rollout of the first SpaceShip III plane on 30 March 2021.

By June 2024, development of the two SpaceShip III vehicles, VSS Imagine and VSS Inspire was canceled, with the intention of using the vehicles for ground testing and development for the successor Delta-class spacecraft. Ultimately, no example of a SpaceShip III vehicle was ever completed or flown in any way (i.e. no captive carry flight, no glide flight, no powered flight nor any other type of flight).

== Concept evolution ==
The purpose originally proposed for SpaceShipThree in 2005 was for commercial orbital spaceflight, as part of a program called "Tier 2" by Burt Rutan founder of Scaled Composites.

By 2008, Scaled Composites had reduced those plans and articulated a conceptual design wherein the SpaceShipThree vehicles were to be used for transportation through point-to-point suborbital spaceflight traveling outside the atmosphere with the spacecraft providing, for example, a two-hour trip on the Kangaroo Route (from London to Sydney or Melbourne).

Scaled was sold to Northrop Grumman in 2007, and references to further work on a conceptual Scaled SS3 ended at some point afterwards from Scaled. Scaled was realigned by Northrop Grumman in 2015 as a research unit. Virgin Galactic acquired full control of The Spaceship Company in 2012, the manufacturer of SS2. The technology was built upon the base technology owned by Mojave Aerospace Ventures of Paul Allen, originally licensed in 2004. As Allen died in 2018, subsequent space activities of the Vulcan Group went inactive.

By 2016, Richard Branson was still planning to have a point-to-point sub-orbital spaceliner follow-up to SpaceShipTwo, for Virgin Galactic and The Spaceship Company.

== Revised concept ==
The SpaceShip III vehicle concept was revised to provide just a few minutes of weightlessness and views for space tourists for Virgin Galactic, and was meant to be a production version of SpaceShipTwo, with improved maintenance and flight rate performance. It did not have point to point transportation capabilities as previously envisioned in 2016.

In early 2021, Virgin Galactic teased an upcoming vehicle on their Twitter account with the name shown in stylized font as "SPACESHIP 3".

== Development ==
The first Spaceship III, VSS Imagine, was announced on 25 February 2021 and was rolled out on 30 March 2021. On that occasion, it was indicated there was ground testing to be done before glide test flights could commence, no earlier than the summer of 2021. Imagine was one of two SpaceShip III class spacecraft on order by Virgin Galactic, the second being VSS Inspire.

== List of vehicles ==
Name	Unveil date	In-service date	Out-of-service date	Notes
VSS Imagine	2021	Never	Never	First SSIII
VSS Inspire	Never	Never	Never	Second announced SSIII

== See also ==
- Stratolaunch Systems
- Supersonic transport
