= Apeiron (Virgin Galactic) =

American commercial sub-orbital space ship

Spaceship Aiperon

General information
- Type: Virgin Galactic Delta
- Manufacturer: The Spaceship Company
- Construction number: 1, a 2nd another under construction

History
- First flight: late 2026 (planned)

Spaceship Aiperon is a suborbital rocket-powered spaceplane developed by Virgin Galactic as the first of its Delta-class spaceships, the successor to the SpaceShipTwo class, specifically VSS Unity. It is lighter and therefore capable of carrying more passengers than the Unity.
