= Mark P. Stucky =

American astronaut

Mark Stucky
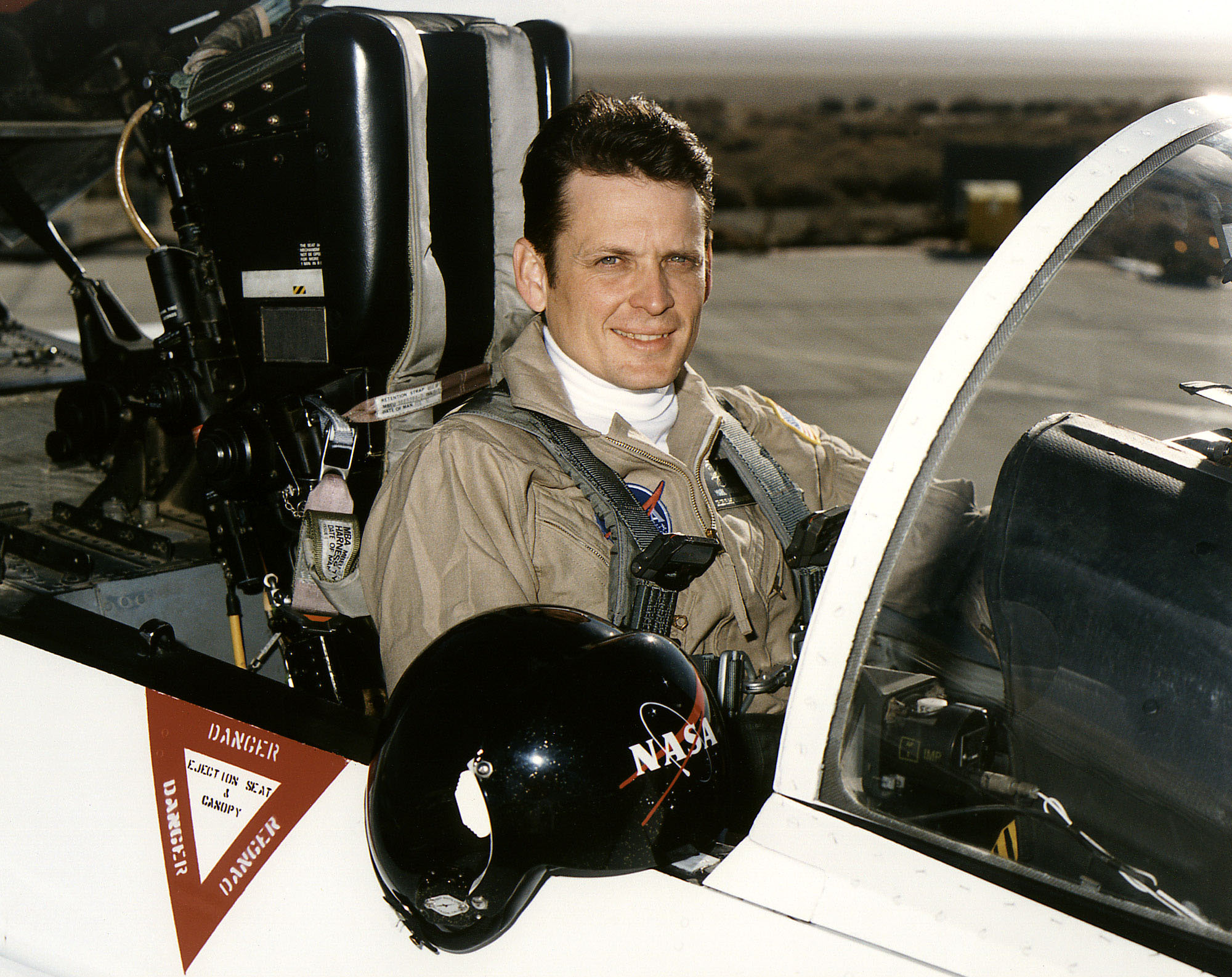
- Born: November 9, 1958 (age 67); Minneapolis, Minnesota, U.S.
- Other name: "Forger"
- Education: Kansas State University, B.S. 1980
- Occupations: Marine aviator, USAF test pilot, test pilot, astronaut
- Space career

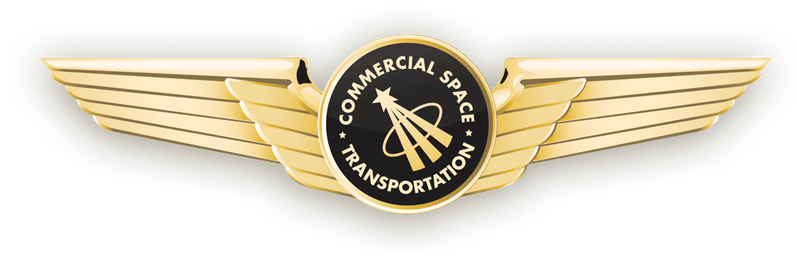
Virgin Galactic commercial astronaut
- Status: Retired
- Rank: Major, USMC; Lieutenant Colonel, USAF
- Selection: 2009
- Missions: VSS Unity VP-03

Mark P. "Forger" Stucky (born 9 November 1958) is an American test pilot and commercial astronaut. In these roles, he was an employee of Virgin Galactic, a private spaceflight company which is developing sub-orbital space tourism flights.

On 13 December 2018, Stucky and co-pilot Frederick Sturckow flew VSS Unity VP-03, a Virgin Galactic test flight which reached an apogee of 82.7 km (51.4 mi). This surpassed the United States convention for the boundary of outer space, (50 mi (80.47 km)), but fell short of the Kármán line (100 km (62.14 mi)), the internationally recognized boundary. The flight was notable as an uncommon example of a high-altitude flight with an apogee falling between the two altitudes; other examples include eleven flights of the North American X-15 and Soyuz MS-10, an aborted spaceflight which had occurred weeks earlier.

After being fired from Virgin Galactic in 2021, Stucky was hired by Blue Origin to be part of that company's Advanced Development Team in October of that year.

Stucky is an accomplished aviator with experience in military, commercial, and experimental flight.

== Early life ==
Mark Stucky was born in Minneapolis, Minnesota, to Paul and Lidia. He lived in Salina, Kansas during his childhood, where Paul taught physics at a local college. Stucky's interest in aviation dates to 1974, when he began hang gliding off of cliffs. He aspired to be a pilot and astronaut, goals which could be realized through entrance into military service. However, Paul was a Mennonite who believed in pacifism, and forbade his son to join the military. Stucky's interest in hang gliding led to a design project which resulted in a scholarship to study at Kansas State University; he graduated in 1980 with a B.S. in Physical Science. Stucky's desire to become a pilot was strong enough that he joined the United States Marine Corps, against his father's wishes.

== Career ==
Stucky received flight training and performed test flights under the auspices of various branches of the armed forces, including the Marines, the Navy, and the Air Force. He flew the F-4 Phantom and "all models of" the F/A-18 Hornet. During the first Gulf War, Stucky flew several combat missions. Following the war he continued his education, completing an M.S. in Aviation Systems at the University of Tennessee.

In 1993 Stucky was hired by NASA as a test pilot. He left the organization in 1999, citing disappointment over a dearth of piloted research projects. He took work as a civilian commercial pilot for United Airlines until 2003 when he re-entered the military, now in the Air Force. Stucky returned to duty in the Middle East, this time in the Iraq War. While there, he followed news of a private spacecraft which had made sub-orbital flights: in 2004 SpaceShipOne, designed by Burt Rutan of Scaled Composites, flew into space three times. Stucky considered that there might be other avenues for becoming an astronaut. SpaceShipOne's success prompted Virgin Group magnate Richard Branson to found Virgin Galactic and partner with Rutan for the development of a sequel craft, SpaceShipTwo, to be used by the new company. In 2005 Rutan and Branson co-founded The Spaceship Company, a further manufacturing entity expressly intended to supply Virgin Galactic with a fleet of SpaceShipTwo craft.

Stucky returned from the Iraq War in 2007 and moved to Nevada, still in the employ of the Air Force, engaged on a classified project. He reached out to Scaled for a job opportunity and was hired as a test pilot in 2009. The first instance of SpaceShipTwo, the VSS Enterprise, made its first flight in 2010; Stucky piloted several test flights of the craft until its catastrophic breakup in 2014. Despite severe criticism following the disaster, Virgin Galactic continued development of its program; Stucky was hired directly by Virgin Galactic as a test pilot in 2015, as part of restructuring. During this period he also served as president of the Society of Experimental Test Pilots for a one-year stint, the normal term of the organization's leadership. In 2016 Stucky piloted the first free flight of the second SpaceShipTwo craft VSS Unity, following release from its companion mother ship, the White Knight Two-class VMS Eve.

In 2021 Stucky was the focus of the book Test Gods: Virgin Galactic and the Making of the Modern Astronaut by Nicholas Schmidle, published on May 4, 2021. The book resulted in a fallout between Stucky and Virgin Galactic in part due to revealing Stucky's internal criticisms of Virgin Galactic's safety standards, and Stucky was barred from participating in Richard Branson's July 11 spacecraft flight. On July 19, 2021, Stucky was then fired from Virgin Galactic over a remote Zoom call. It was later revealed there was a course deviation on the 11 July flight, which triggered a Federal Aviation Administration investigation, to which Stucky stated, "the most misleading statement today was Virgin Galactic's. The facts are the pilots failed to trim to achieve the proper pitch rate, the winds were well within limits, they did nothing of substance to address the trajectory error, and entered Class A airspace without authorization."

== VSS Unity VP-03 ==
On 13 December 2018, at an altitude of 43,000 feet, the VMS Eve released the VSS Unity for its fourth powered test flight. Lead pilot Stucky and co-pilot Sturckow flew Unity at a maximum Mach of 2.9 to a maximum altitude of 82.7 kilometers, thereby surpassing the 50-mile limit used in the United States to denote the limit of space, but falling short of the Kármán line. Both craft landed safely afterwards. The flight was publicized online in various tweets by Virgin Galactic, Branson himself, and related personnel. Per the U.S. convention the flight was the first human spaceflight beginning in the United States since STS-135, the final flight of the Space Shuttle in 2011.

== Personal life ==
Stucky is divorced from his first wife Joan with whom he has three children. He has remarried to a second wife, Cheryl Agin.
