= VGX =

VGX may refer to:

- Vector graphics, a form of computer graphics
- VGX (award show), a video game award show
- Virgin Galactic, a spaceflight company
