= Matthew Isakowitz Fellowship =

US non-profit for space-related internships

- Founded: 2017
- Founders: Monica and Steve Isakowitz; Sirisha Bandla
- Purpose: Aerospace Engineering; Commercial Space
- Location: Los Angeles, California
- Region served: United States
- Website: matthewisakowitzfellowship.org

The Matthew Isakowitz Fellowship is a non-profit program in the United States that provided paid internships and executive mentorship to exceptional undergraduate and graduate students seeking careers in commercial space for nearly a decade. The fellowship was created in memory of Matthew Isakowitz, an American aerospace engineer and early contributor to the field of commercial spaceflight who died at the age of 29.

== Motivation and overview ==
The Matthew Isakowitz Fellowship Program connected exceptional students with the resources to become leaders in the commercial space industry, with the goal of bolstering the then-fledgling industry and fostering excitement for commercial spaceflight in young engineers. Matthew Isakowitz was an aerospace engineer from Princeton University who worked at XPRIZE, SpaceX, and Astranis, and served as associate director of the Commercial Spaceflight Federation. He also worked on the New Horizons mission at the Johns Hopkins Applied Physics Laboratory, for which the minor planet 78867 Isakowitz was named. The fellowship was founded by Isakowitz's family, including his father Steve Isakowitz, and former colleague Sirisha Bandla in 2017.

Between 2017 and 2024, the program offered students paid summer internships at commercial space companies (including SpaceX, Blue Origin, Rocket Lab, etc.), travel stipends, and mentorship from notable aerospace leaders, including CEOs (e.g. Tom Mueller, George Whitesides, Mandy Vaughn), 10 astronauts (e.g. John M. Grunsfeld, Cadey Coleman, Sandy Magnus), former NASA administrators, JPL directors, and other experienced executives. Fellows were also paired with previous alumni, who acted as peer mentors, and were flown out to the annual summit in Los Angeles, California to network, tour aerospace companies, and to meet industry leaders such as Elon Musk and Buzz Aldrin.

In 2024, the fellowship program announced that it would no longer accept new fellows. The program remains partnered with the Brooke Owens Fellowship, Commercial Spaceflight Federation, and the Future Space Leaders Foundation.

== Alumni ==
As of 2024, the Matthew Isakowitz Fellowship has 200 alumni across 7 cohorts associated with 100+ different universities internationally. The program was noted for being increasingly competitive, with more than half of all fellows associated with MIT, Stanford, or Georgia Tech alone.

Thousands of students from around the United States applied to the fellowship. Approximately thirty were selected annually. Selection was made through an evaluation of merit and the perceived embodiment of Isakowitz's qualities. This was done primarily by means of interviews and essay responses. Finalists were matched with host companies, who independently conducted interviews and awarded offers.
