= Michael Colglazier =

American business executive (born 1967)

- Born: Michael A. Colglazier; 1967 (age 58–59); Lafayette, Indiana, U.S.
- Education: Stanford University (BS); Harvard Business School (MBA)
- Years active: 1989–present
- Employer(s): The Walt Disney Company (1989-2020); Virgin Galactic (2020–present)
- Title: President and CEO
- Board member of: Six Flags Entertainment Corporation; UC Irvine CEO Roundtable; Rice University Engineering Advisory Board
- Spouse: DeAnna Colglazier

Michael A. Colglazier (born 1967) is an American business executive. He was president of Disneyland Resort in Anaheim, California from 2013 to 2018 and president of Disney Parks International until 2020.

He was appointed president and CEO of Virgin Galactic, a California-based commercial aerospace and space tourism company, in July 2020.

== Early life and education ==
Colglazier was born in Lafayette, Indiana in 1967. His mother Nancy was a schoolteacher and his father, John Colglazier, was an executive at CTS Electronics. His family moved to the small town of Elkhart, Indiana before high school. He attended Stanford University, where he graduated with a Bachelor of Science degree in industrial engineering in 1989. He subsequently earned an MBA from Harvard Business School in 1994.

== Career ==
=== The Walt Disney Company ===
Colglazier began his career at The Walt Disney Company in 1989 as a corporate strategic planning analyst. After spending a summer as an associate at Bain & Company in 1993, he returned to Disney in 1994 as General Manager of Epcot at Walt Disney World Resort in Florida, a role he held until 2000.

Over the following years, Colglazier held a succession of senior roles within Disney's Parks, Experiences and Products segment, including vice president of operations strategy and technology, vice president of Disney photo imaging, and vice president of global development, where he was responsible for identifying new international growth and business opportunities for the parks and resorts division.

From approximately 2010 to 2013, Colglazier served as Vice President of Disney's Animal Kingdom at Walt Disney World Resort in Florida, where he oversaw day-to-day operations and was involved in early planning and development for the park's Avatar-themed expansion.

In January 2013, Colglazier was named President of The Disneyland Resort in Anaheim, California, succeeding George Kalogridis. In this role, he oversaw a workforce of approximately 30,000 cast members at the 500-acre resort. Under his leadership, the resort achieved record business performance, driven in part by the execution of the 60th Anniversary Diamond Celebration and the introduction of the Marvel franchise into the park. He also initiated and oversaw planning for the resort's $2 billion expansion, which included the 14-acre Star Wars: Galaxy's Edge land that opened to the public in 2019.

In March 2018, Colglazier was named president and managing director of Disney Parks Asia Pacific, and was subsequently elevated to president and managing director of Disney Parks International, a role he held until his departure from the company in July 2020. In this capacity, he oversaw the operations and development of Disneyland Paris, Hong Kong Disneyland, Shanghai Disney Resort, and Tokyo Disney Resort in partnership with the Oriental Land Company. He was succeeded as President of the Disneyland Resort by Josh D'Amaro.

=== Virgin Galactic ===
On July 13, 2020, Virgin Galactic announced the appointment of Colglazier as its new chief executive officer, effective July 20, 2020, replacing founder and outgoing CEO George Whitesides, who transitioned to a newly created Chief Space Officer role. Colglazier also joined the company's board of directors at that time. In February 2021, he was additionally named President of the company.

Colglazier joined Virgin Galactic as the company was in the final stages of its test flight program and preparing for the launch of commercial spaceflight service. Sir Richard Branson, the founder of Virgin Group, stated that Colglazier's background in consumer-facing businesses and world-class customer experience brands provided a strong fit for the company's requirements as it moved toward commercial operations.

On June 29, 2023, under Colglazier, Virgin Galactic completed its first-ever commercial spaceflight, designated Galactic 01, carrying three crew members from the Italian Air Force and the National Research Council of Italy aboard the VSS Unity spaceplane from Spaceport America in New Mexico. The approximately 75-minute mission, purchased by the Italian government, carried 13 scientific research payloads to examine biomedicine, thermo-fluid dynamics, and materials science in microgravity conditions. A second commercial flight, Galactic 02, followed in August 2023 carrying private astronauts, with monthly commercial flights planned thereafter.

In mid-2024, Virgin Galactic ceased flights of its VSS Unity spaceplane in order to focus on the development of its next-generation Delta-class spacecraft, which are intended to support a higher launch cadence and commence commercial service by approximately 2026. In July 2025, Virgin Galactic entered into an amended and restated employment agreement with Colglazier, setting a five-year term with automatic one-year renewals and an annual base salary of $1,125,000, increasing to $1,250,000 on April 1, 2026.

Colglazier has served as a member of the board of directors of Six Flags Entertainment Corporation. He also serves as chairman of the CEO Roundtable at the University of California, Irvine and as a member of the Engineering Advisory Board of Rice University.

== Personal life ==
Colglazier was born and raised in Indiana and has described experiencing space as a childhood dream. He and his wife DeAnna have two children.
