= Mojave Aerospace Ventures =

Spaceflight company

Mojave Aerospace Ventures (MAV) is a company founded by Paul Allen and Burt Rutan to handle the commercial spinoffs from the Tier One project. It owns the intellectual property arising from Tier One, and it is in turn owned by Allen (the majority shareholder) and Rutan's Scaled Composites. In 2004, it signed a deal with Virgin Galactic to develop the Virgin SpaceShip, a suborbital spacecraft, for space tourism. Virgin Group and Scaled Composites have subsequently formed a joint venture, The Spaceship Company, to manufacture the spacecraft.

== Company ==
The structure of Mojave Aerospace Ventures appears to be the basis of the deal between Allen and Rutan for the funding of Tier One. The company owns all the intellectual property of the Tier One project, such as patents, and so controls commercial exploitation. Allen, the sole source of funding for Tier One, is the majority owner. Rutan, having developed the technology, owns a minority stake. This stands in contrast to the company more usually associated with Tier One, Scaled Composites, which, as of 2007, is owned by Northrop Grumman. MAV serves to separate Tier One spinoffs from Scaled. Mojave Aerospace Ventures is part of Allen's Vulcan Aerospace.

== Tier One derivative applications ==
=== Virgin Galactic ===
On September 25, 2004, MAV agreed on a joint venture with Richard Branson's newly formed company Virgin Galactic, to develop a suborbital spacecraft for the space tourism market. The initial plan is to build five Virgin SpaceShips, based on scaling up the Tier One SpaceShipOne (SS1) design, with White Knight One (WK1) similarly evolved. The spacecraft would be manufactured by The Spaceship Company.

The designs for the Tier 1b customer suborbital spaceflight vehicles are referred to as SpaceShipTwo (SS2) and its carrier aircraft is White Knight Two (WK2). The system, a suborbital space tourist system.

A further development of the technology, Tier Two and SpaceShipThree (SS3) was mooted. Either as, initially an orbital system, or, later, suborbital transcontinental/transoceanic transport. SS3 would eventually become into a further development of Tier 1b.

=== Stratolaunch Systems ===
A further application of the Tier One technology is for Allen's Stratolaunch Systems under Vulcan Aerospace with its Stratolaunch carrier aircraft Roc.
