= Paul Scully-Power =

Australian-American oceanographer and astronaut (born 1944)

Paul Desmond Scully-Power AM GOSE FRAeS
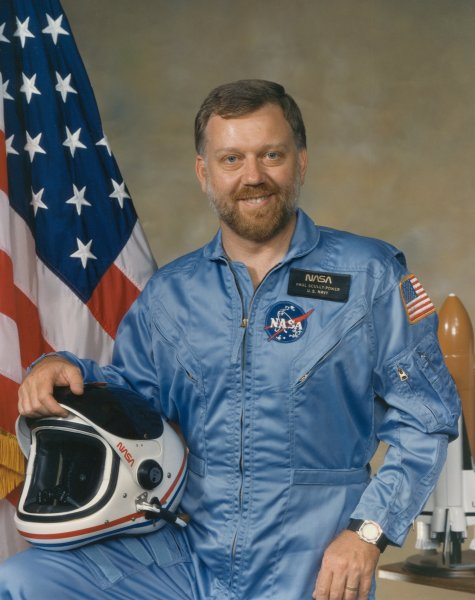
- Born: May 28, 1944 (age 82); Sydney, New South Wales, Australia
- Occupation: Oceanographer
- Space career

U.S. Navy Payload Specialist
- Time in space: 8d 05h 23m
- Mission: STS-41-G
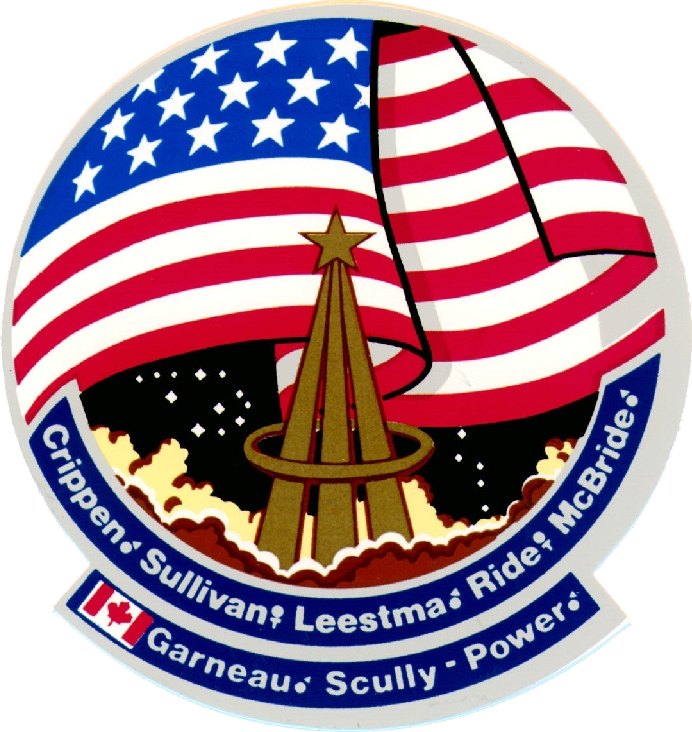
- Mission insignia

Paul Desmond Scully-Power (born May 28, 1944) is an Australian-born American oceanographer, technology expert, business executive and astronaut. In 1984, while a civilian employee of the United States Naval Undersea Warfare Center, he flew aboard NASA Space Shuttle mission STS-41-G as a payload specialist. He was the first Australian-born person to journey into space, and the first astronaut with a beard.

During his time in space he was able to confirm the existence of spiral eddies in the ocean. He aimed to confirm the theory with high resolution radar, but his mission was more successful than expected: he discovered that with the right light he could observe them with the naked eye, and with an ordinary film camera. He observed eddies at 13 places around the globe.

Scully-Power went on to work in private industry. He is considered a world expert in remote sensing: visible, infra-red, radar and acoustic and is considered a security, aviation and aerospace expert.

He was appointed a Member of the Order of Australia (AM) in the 2004 Australia Day Honours "for service to science in the fields of oceanography and space remote sensing, and to the community through contributions to a range of government regulatory agencies and through raising public awareness of conservation issues."

== Early life and education ==
Paul Scully-Power was born in Sydney, Australia. He attended schools in London, and Saint Ignatius' College, Riverview and St Pius X College, Chatswood, in Sydney. He studied applied mathematics at the University of Sydney, where he resided at St John's College, and graduated with a Bachelor of Science with Honours in 1966 and a Diploma of Education in 1967.

== Career ==
In January 1967, after graduating from the University of Sydney, Scully-Power was approached by the Royal Australian Navy to set up the first oceanographic group within the Navy.

From January 1967 to July 1972 he was a scientific officer, and remained the first permanent head of the oceanographic group.

From July 1972 to March 1974 he was an Australian Navy exchange scientist, U.S. Navy. He also worked at the U.S. Naval Underwater Systems Center, New London, Connecticut, and at the Office of Naval Research, Washington, D.C. During this period, he was invited to assist the Earth Observations team on the Skylab Project and has worked in space oceanography for each crewed spacecraft mission since that time.

From March 1974 to March 1975 he returned to Australia, planned and executed the joint Australia, New Zealand, United States project ANZUS EDDY, which was the first combined oceanographic and acoustic measurement of an ocean eddy ever conducted.

In 1976, he was appointed a foreign principal investigator for the Heat Capacity Mapping Mission, which was one of a series of satellites launched by NASA to explore the usefulness of remote sensing measurements.

In October 1977, he emigrated to the United States and was offered a position at the Naval Underwater Systems Center. This position is that of a senior scientist and technical specialist on the staff of the associate technical director for research and technology with the responsibility to insure the development of a comprehensive and balanced technology base within the center. He became a U.S. citizen in 1982.

=== NASA career ===
In June 1984, Scully-Power was chosen by NASA to be a payload specialist (known among the crew affectionately as a blanket counter) on the 13th Shuttle mission, which would study Earth sciences. His space flight STS-41-G Challenger (October 5–13, 1984) was launched from and returned to land at the Kennedy Space Center, Florida. STS-41-G was the first mission with a 7-person crew, and the first to demonstrate American orbital fuel transfer. During the 8-day flight, the crew deployed the Earth Radiation Budget Satellite, conducted scientific observations of the earth with the OSTA-3 pallet and Large Format Camera, and demonstrated potential satellite refueling with an EVA and associated hydrazine transfer. At mission conclusion, Scully-Power had traveled over 3.4 million miles in 133 Earth orbits, and logged over 197 hours in space.

His role was to investigate spiral eddies, which at the time were thought to be rare. He was able to photograph them with an ordinary camera, and show that they were ubiquitous.

NASA initially expected him to shave his beard before spaceflight, but allowed it after he was able to demonstrate that it did not affect his helmet's seal.

=== Corporate career ===
Scully-Power became the CTO of Tenix Group in 2004, Australia's largest defence and technology contractor. In 2007 was appointed chairman and CEO of SensorConnect Inc., a Silicon Valley high-tech company.

Scully-Power has extensive commercial, government and academic experience in Australia, New Zealand, the United Kingdom, and the United States, and is widely recognised in the fields of defence and national security, aviation and aerospace, marine science, communications and systems analysis, and education.

Scully-Power has served as a director of a number of public and private corporate and advisory boards worldwide.

Scully-Power is past chairman of the Australian Civil Aviation Safety Authority and the federal government's International Space Advisory Group, a former chancellor of Bond University (Australia's largest private university), and was the inaugural chairman of the Queensland Premier's Science and Technology Council. Prior to that he spent over twenty years in the United States where he managed and led many high technology and defence industry programs. He served with the U.S. Navy, NASA, the Pentagon, and the White House, where he was the head of a government-industry partnership for the development of advanced communications systems as part of the White House National Technology Strategy Program. He was also responsible for the funding of major programs at universities and research institutions on behalf of the U.S. government. Additionally, he held the distinguished chair of environmental acoustics, was a research associate at the Scripps Institution of Oceanography, chairman of membership of the Connecticut Academy of Science and Engineering, served on the University and College Accreditation Board, and was president of the Fort Trumbull Federal Credit Union. Before going to America, he was the inaugural head of the Royal Australian Navy's Oceanographic Group, deploying to sea on 26 cruises and qualifying as a naval ship's diver.

Scully-Power was the first president of the U.N. International Commission on Space Oceanography. He is U.S. Air Force qualified for full pressure suit flying, and was a flight crew instructor in the Astronaut Office, Johnson Space Center, Houston, Texas. Scully-Power is a fellow of the Royal Aeronautical Society, a liveryman of the Guild of Air Pilots and Air Navigators, and a freeman of the City of London.

He is involved in many business and community groups through his roles as patron of the Australian Aviation Museum, the Royal Australian Navy Laboratory Association, and the League of Ancient Mariners; past vice president of the Naval Warfare Officers' Association; a member of the International Trade and Government Committee of the U.S. Chamber of Commerce; and a director of the Australia Youth Trust established by Princess Diana. He is also a founding member of the advisory board of Environment Business Australia. Scully-Power served for five years on the Australian Trade Commission, and for eight years on the Australian Institute of Company Directors. A larger than life-size oil painting of Scully-Power hangs in the National Portrait Gallery in Canberra.

He was an advocate for the NSW bid to host the Australian Space Agency.

== Awards and honors ==
- U.S. Navy Distinguished Service Medal
- NASA Space Flight Medal
- The Casey Baldwin Medallion of the Canadian Aeronautics and Space Institute
- United States Presidential Letter of Commendation
- U.S. Congressional Certificate of Merit
- United Nations Association Distinguished Service Award
- Laureate of the Albatross (Oceanography's 'Nobel Prize')
- The Order of the Decibel (the highest award in the field of Underwater Acoustics)
- Oswald Watt Gold Medal (Australia's highest aviation award).
- Member of the Order of Australia (AM)
- Grand Officer (Second Class) of the Order of the Star of Ethiopia (GOSE) (for developing a water filtration system)
- Life Membership of the Space Industry Association of Australia

== Organizations ==
- American Geophysical Union
- Acoustical Society of America
- American Meteorological Society
- American Association for the Advancement of Science
- U.S. Naval Institute
- Australian Marine Sciences Association
- Luskintyre Aviation Museum

== Personal life ==
Scully-Power is married with six children. His recreational interests include squash and racketball, sailing, and reading.

== Technical papers ==
Scully-Power is considered a world expert in remote sensing: visible, infra-red, radar and acoustic sensing and has earned the highest degree in science, a Doctor of Science in Applied Mathematics for his work. He has published over ninety international scientific reports and technical journal articles, including the Bakerian Lecture of the Royal Society. He has been a major contributor to the U.S. Navy's warfare appraisal and surveillance strategies, and was recognised by the University of Sydney in 1995 as its Distinguished Graduate. He discovered the phenomenon of ocean spiral eddies.

He has published in many fields, including physical oceanography, underwater acoustics, remote sensing, applied mathematics, space oceanography, marine biology, meteorology, and ocean engineering.

== Biography ==
- Oceans to Orbit: The Story of Australia's First Man in Space, Paul Scully-Power, 1995, by Colin Burgess.
- Australia's Astronauts: Three Men and a Spaceflight Dream, 1999, by Colin Burgess.
- Australia's Astronauts: Countdown to a Spaceflight Dream, 2009, by Colin Burgess.

Academic offices
Preceded by Harry Messel	Chancellor of Bond University; 1998 – 1999	Succeeded by Imelda Roche
