= USV Maxlimer =

Remotely controlled unmanned surface vehicle

USV Maxlimer is a semi-autonomous, remotely controlled unmanned surface vehicle (USV) owned and operated by the British company SEA-KIT International. She was the winning entry in the Shell Ocean Discovery X Prize competition, and subsequently has been used as a proof-of-concept vessel for uncrewed, over-the-horizon offshore operations.

== History ==
Maxlimer was constructed in Maldon, Essex, for the GEBCO-NF Alumni Team, an international group that competed in the Ocean Discovery X Prize. During the competition, which took place in late 2018, Maxlimer deployed a HUGIN autonomous underwater vehicle to map 278 square kilometres (107 sq mi) of seafloor in the Mediterranean Sea off the Greek city of Kalamata in 24 hours, an accomplishment that made GEBCO-NF the winning team.

In May 2019, Maxlimer made a demonstration crossing of the North Sea between West Mersea, England and Ostend, Belgium. On the outbound trip to Belgium, she carried a cargo of 5 kilograms (11 lb) of oysters, and on the return a case of beer. Though largely ceremonial, as the voyages were for the purposes of demonstration, SEA-KIT states it was the first commercial autonomous crossing of the North Sea. In July, the USV Maxlimer again deployed and recovered a HUGIN Unmanned Underwater Vehicle (UUV) several times in commercial service for Equinor to inspect offshore underwater pipelines in the North Sea - the first time that inspection equipment had been remotely controlled past line of sight.

SEA-KIT intended to send Maxlimer on a transatlantic crossing in early 2020 as part of a project co-funded by the UK Space Agency through the European Space Agency’s Business Application programme. This would have been the first ever unmanned crossing of the Atlantic, but as a result of restrictions imposed during the COVID-19 pandemic, the voyage had to be cancelled. Instead, in July 2020, Maxlimer sailed from Plymouth on a 22-day mission to map about 1,000 square kilometres (390 sq mi) of previously uncharted seafloor 460 kilometres (290 mi) southwest of England on Europe's continental margin. The project aimed to demonstrate the capabilities of current technologies to survey unexplored or to-date inadequately surveyed ocean frontiers and served to prove the capabilities of SEA-KIT's USV design, namely long endurance, over-the-horizon capability and ocean-going ability. With its project partners, SEA-KIT demonstrated the ability to conduct remote survey operations with safe control of the USV via satellite communications from anywhere in the world. The Atlantic mission was covered by BBC News.

== Design ==
The SEA-KIT X-class USV, of which Maxlimer was the first, is a remotely controlled, configurable mother-ship platform that can launch and recover remote vehicles such as large AUV/UUVs or ROVs for missions including deep-water bathymetry, offshore and subsea asset inspection and hydrographic survey with reduced risk to personnel, decreased costs and lower environmental impact. A large payload capacity, long range and over-the-horizon endurance means that multiple missions can be undertaken in a solo capacity or as part of a larger fleet of crewed or uncrewed vessels.

Data can be transmitted via broadband link or satellite following on-board processing and compression, or stored on board for future retrieval. SEA-KIT USVs are controlled using SEA-KIT's proprietary G-SAVI control and surveillance platform, which provides safe and secure operation from remote control centres. The SEA-KIT X class design holds Unmanned Marine Systems certification from Lloyd's Register.

Maxlimer is 11.75 metres (38.5 ft) long and 2.2 metres (7.2 ft) wide. She has a diesel-electric propulsion system, which gives her a top speed of around 4 knots (7.4 km/h; 4.6 mph) and extended endurance capability up to 14 days. Although her speed is low, SEA-KIT claims that Maxlimer uses only 5% as much fuel as a comparable crewed vessel as a result of weight savings and efficiencies in the propulsion system. Maxlimer can operate autonomously, depending on conditions, or under remote control from a shore-based command facility.
