= Mati Carbon =

Houston-based carbon removal organization

Mati Carbon is a Houston-based carbon removal organization. It uses enhanced rock weathering, a process in which crushed basalt is applied to farmland so that carbon dioxide reacts with water and minerals and becomes bicarbonate.

In 2025, Mati Carbon received the $50 million prize in the XPRIZE Carbon Removal competition.

== History ==
Mati Carbon was founded in 2022 by Shantanu Agarwal.

The organization is structured as a nonprofit.

Mati Carbon's work is connected to research by Yale geochemist Noah Planavsky.

The organization developed its carbon removal work around enhanced rock weathering on farmland.

== Technology ==
Mati Carbon uses enhanced rock weathering to remove carbon dioxide from the atmosphere. The process involves applying crushed basalt to cropland.

When basalt interacts with water and carbon dioxide, the carbon dioxide is converted into bicarbonate. The bicarbonate can move through water into rivers, aquifers, or oceans. The process also releases minerals from the rock into the soil.

Mati Carbon uses soil sampling, geotagging, transport data, and software-based tracking to measure and document its carbon removal process.

== Operations ==
Mati Carbon began by applying basalt to rice paddies in India.

By 2025, Mati Carbon had work involving farms in India, Zambia, and Tanzania. Farmers do not pay to have basalt applied to their fields.

Mati Carbon's revenue model is based on the sale of carbon removal credits.

== XPRIZE Carbon Removal ==
In April 2025, Mati Carbon received the $50 million prize in the XPRIZE Carbon Removal competition.

The competition was launched in 2021 and included 1,300 teams from 88 countries.

The competition required teams to demonstrate a system for removing carbon dioxide from the atmosphere or oceans and storing it.

Mati Carbon and three runner-up teams met the competition requirement of removing at least 1,000 tons of carbon dioxide during the final year of the competition.
