= Sirisha Bandla =

American aeronautical engineer and commercial astronaut (born 1988)

- Bandla in 2023
- Born: Guntur, Andhra Pradesh, India
- Education: Purdue University, George Washington University
- Space career
- Current occupation: Vice President of Government Affairs and Research Operations, Virgin Galactic
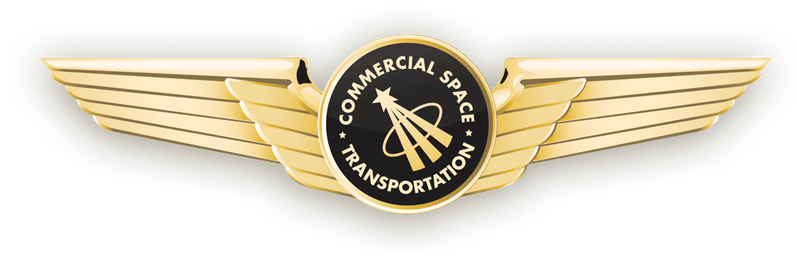
- Previous occupation: Commercial Astronaut
- Status: Active
- Time in space: 14 min 17 seconds
- Selection: Virgin Galactic
- Mission: Virgin Galactic Unity 22
- Mission insignia

Sirisha Bandla (born 1988) is an American aeronautical engineer and commercial astronaut. She was the Vice President of Government Affairs and Research Operations for Virgin Galactic. She flew on the Virgin Galactic Unity 22 mission which made her the second India-born woman to go to space and the fourth person of Indian descent ever to go past the line of space after Rakesh Sharma, Kalpana Chawla and Sunita Williams.

== Early life and education ==
Bandla was born into a Telugu Hindu family in the Guntur district of Andhra Pradesh, India. After her birth, Bandla's family moved to Tenali, Andhra Pradesh. Until the age of five, Bandla split her time between her grandfather's house in Hyderabad, and her grandmother's house in Tenali. Bandla later moved to Houston, United States with her parents.

Bandla received her bachelor's degree in aeronautical engineering from Purdue University. She subsequently achieved her master's degree in business administration from George Washington University.

== Career ==
Bandla hoped to become a NASA astronaut but was ruled out on medical grounds due to her eyesight. She previously worked for the Commercial Spaceflight Federation as an aerospace engineer with Matthew Isakowitz. She later co-founded the Matthew Isakowitz Fellowship in his honor.

Bandla joined Virgin Galactic in 2015, where she works as the vice president of government affairs. On Sunday 11 July 2021 Bandla flew on the Virgin Galactic Unity 22 test flight alongside Sir Richard Branson, Dave Mackay, Michael Masucci, Beth Moses, Colin Bennett. The rocket plane flew 85 km (53 mi) above Earth, thereby qualifying the crew as FAA commercial astronauts. During the flight, Bandla conducted an experiment from the University of Florida to investigate how plants react to the change in gravity. About her flight, Bandla's grandfather, Dr Bandla Ragaiah, said: “From a very young age she had this ambition to explore the sky, the moon, and the stars. Sirisha had set her eyes on space, and I am not at all surprised that she is all set to realise her dream." During her spaceflight, she reached a height of 89.9 km above the Earth's surface. Unity 22, being the first fully crewed test flight for Virgin Galactic, qualified Sirisha to be awarded commercial astronaut wings by the Federal Aviation Authority. In June 2025, she retired from her role at Virgin Galactic.

She was honored as one of the BBC 100 Women in December 2022.

== See also ==
- List of Asian American astronauts
- List of female spacefarers
- Telugu Americans
