= Xprize Foundation =

Non-profit organisation in the U.S.

XPRIZE
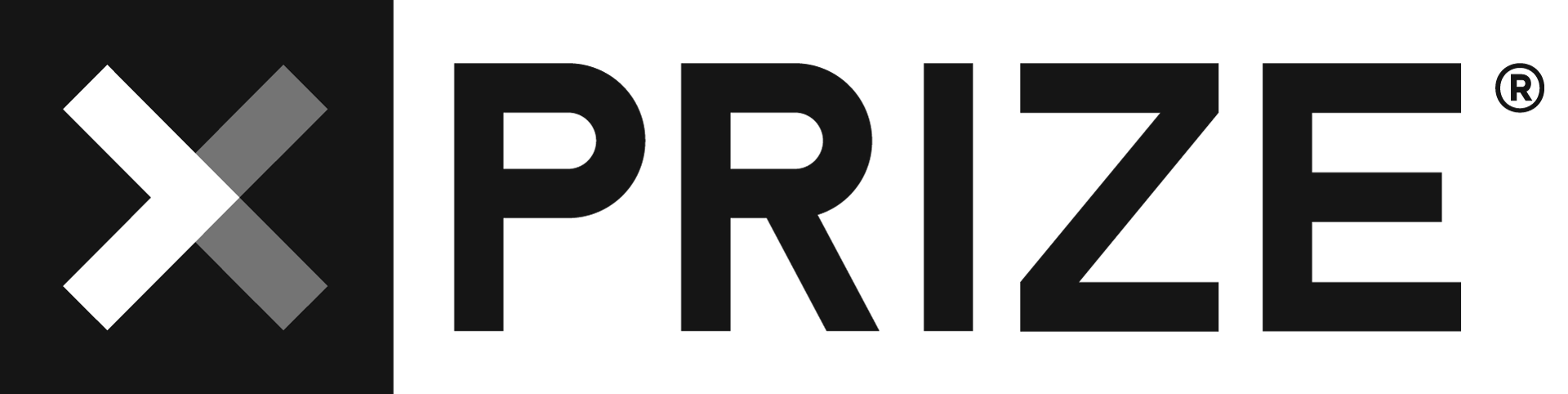
- Founded: 1994; 32 years ago
- Founder: Peter Diamandis
- Purpose: Public competitions
- Location: Culver City, California
- Method: Revolution through competition
- Key people: Anousheh Ansari (CEO); Peter Diamandis (executive chairman); Robert K. Weiss (vice chairman)
- Website: www.xprize.org

XPRIZE Foundation is a non-profit organization that designs and hosts public competitions intended to encourage technological development. The XPRIZE mission is to bring about "radical breakthroughs for the benefit of humanity" through incentivized competition. It aims to motivate individuals, companies, and organizations to develop ideas and technologies.

The Ansari X Prize relating to spacecraft development was awarded in 2004, intended to inspire research and development into technology for space exploration.

== Background ==
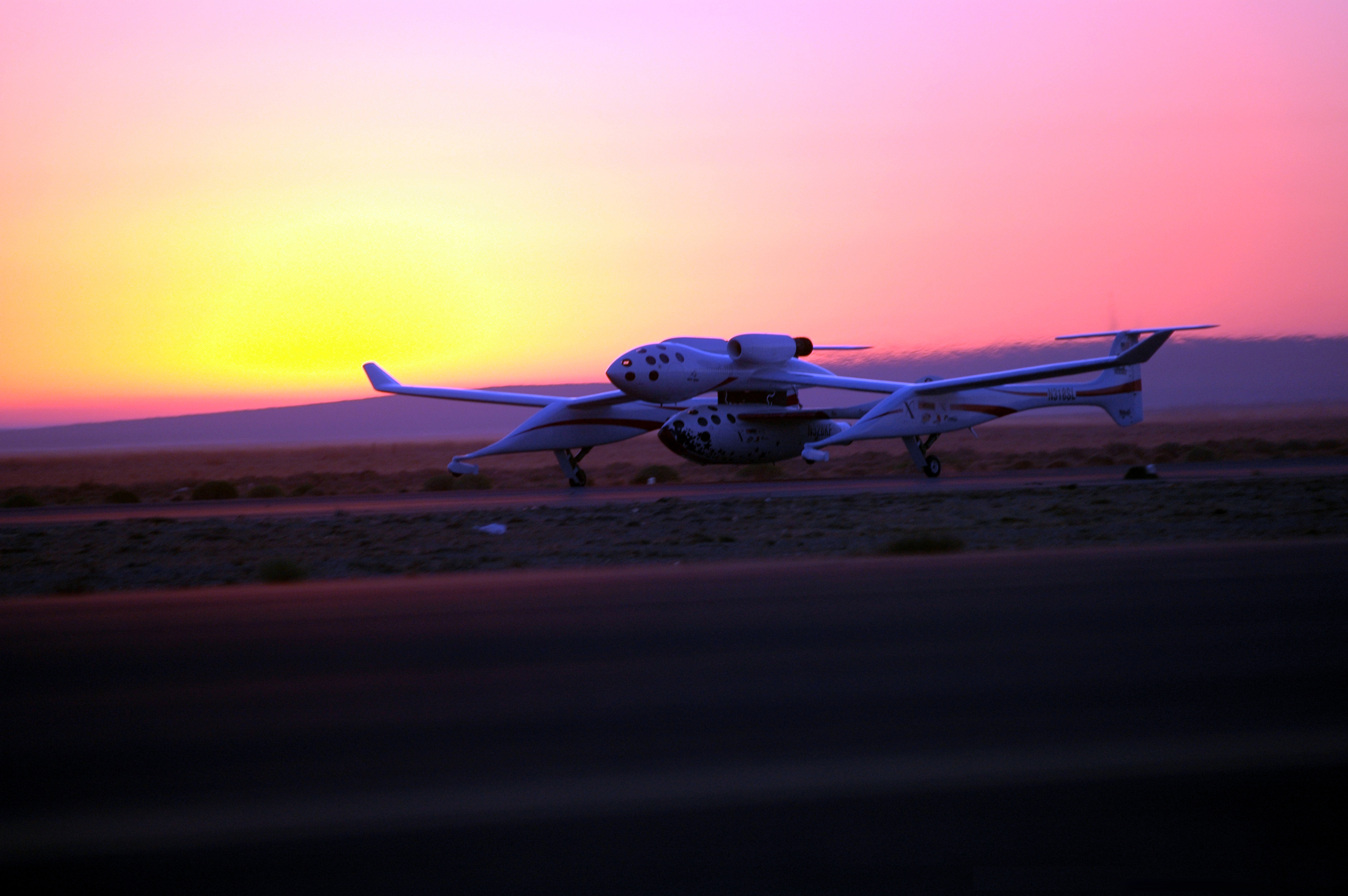
SpaceShipOne Takeoff

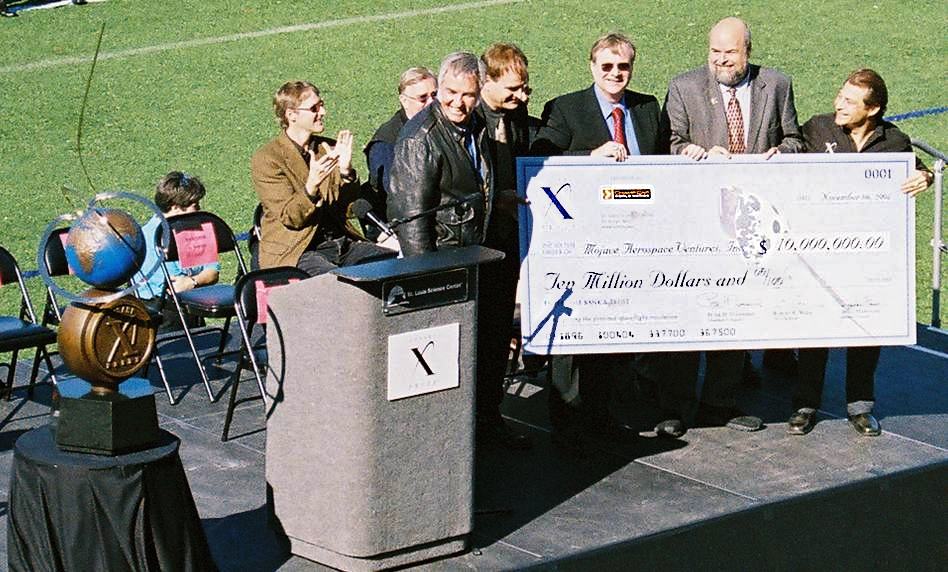
The first, titled the Ansari XPRIZE, was presented on November 6, 2004.

The first XPRIZE, the Ansari XPRIZE, was inspired by the Orteig Prize, a $25,000 prize offered in 1919 by French hotelier Raymond Orteig for the first nonstop flight between New York City and Paris. In 1927, underdog Charles Lindbergh won the prize in a modified single-engine Ryan aircraft called the Spirit of St. Louis. In total, nine teams spent $400,000 in pursuit of the Orteig Prize.

In 1996, entrepreneur Peter Diamandis offered a $10-million prize to the first privately financed team that could build and fly a three-passenger vehicle 100 kilometers into space twice within two weeks. The contest, later titled the Ansari XPRIZE for Suborbital Spaceflight, motivated 26 teams from seven nations to invest more than $100 million in pursuit of the $10 million purse. On October 4, 2004, the Ansari XPRIZE was won by Mojave Aerospace Ventures, who successfully completed the contest in their spacecraft SpaceShipOne. The prize was awarded in a ceremony at the Saint Louis Science Center in St. Louis, Missouri.

The foundation has also created the XPRIZE Cup rocket challenge competition.

== XPRIZE unifying principles ==
XPRIZES are monetary rewards to incentivize three primary goals:

- Attract investments from outside the sector that take new approaches to difficult problems.
- Create significant results that are real and meaningful. Competitions have measurable goals, and are created to promote adoption of innovation.
- Cross national and disciplinary boundaries to encourage teams around the world to invest the intellectual and financial capital required to solve difficult challenges.

Other organizations such as the Nobel Prize committee award prizes and financial rewards to individuals or organizations that produce novel advances in science, medicine and technology. One difference between the XPRIZE foundation and other similar organizations is the awarding of prizes based on the first to achieve objective 'finish line' requirements rather than a selection committee discussing the relative merits of different endeavors. For instance, the Archon Genomics XPRIZE target was to sequence 100 human genomes in 10 days or less, with less than one error per 100,000 DNA base pairs, covering 98% of the genome and costing less than $10,000 per genome (this prize was canceled because it was outpaced by innovation).

The prize can increase attention to endeavors that otherwise might not receive much publicity. XPRIZE is currently developing new prizes in Exploration (Space and Oceans), Life Sciences, Energy & Environment, Education and Global Development. The prizes will aim to help improve lives, create equity of opportunity and stimulate new, important discoveries.

== Prizes and events overseen ==
=== Past contests ===
==== 1996–2004 Ansari XPRIZE for Suborbital Spaceflight ====
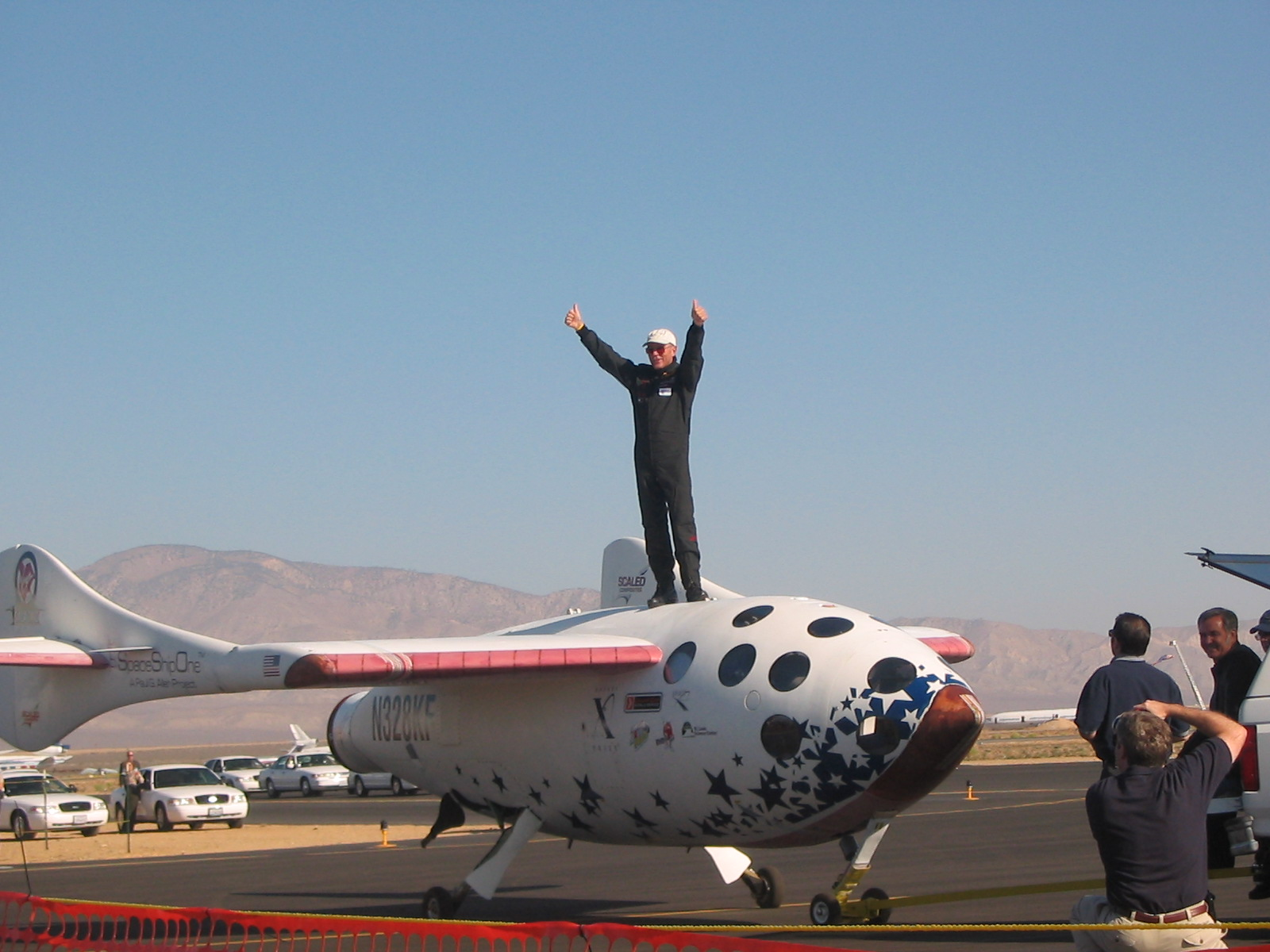
Astronaut Mike Melvill after his award-winning September 29, 2004 spaceflight

The Ansari XPRIZE for Suborbital Spaceflight was the first prize from the foundation. It successfully challenged teams to build private spaceships capable of carrying three people and fly two times within two weeks to open the space frontier. The first part of the Ansari XPRIZE requirements was fulfilled by Mike Melvill on September 29, 2004, On SpaceShipOne, a spacecraft designed by Burt Rutan and financed by Paul Allen, co-founder and former CEO of Microsoft. On that ship, Melvill broke the 100-kilometer (62.5 mi) mark, internationally recognized as the boundary of outer space. Brian Binnie completed the second part of the requirements on October 4, 2004, winning the prize. As a result, US$10 million was awarded to the winner, but the project cost approximately $25 million. More than $100 million was invested in new technologies by the teams in pursuit of the prize.

Awarding this first prize gave XPRIZE as much publicity as the winners themselves. After the 2004 success there was ample media coverage to afford both Scaled Composites and XPRIZE additional support for them to expand and continue to pursue their aims. Following this early success several other XPRIZES were announced.

The Ansari XPRIZE won the Space Foundation's Douglas S. Morrow Public Outreach Award in 2005. The award is given annually to an individual or organization that has made significant contributions to public awareness of space programs.

==== 2007–2010 Progressive Insurance Automotive XPRIZE ====
The goal of the Progressive Insurance Automotive XPRIZE was to design, build and race super-efficient vehicles that achieve 100 MPGe (2.35 liter/100 kilometer) efficiency, produce less than 200 grams/mile well-to-wheel CO_{2} equivalent emissions, and could be manufactured for the mass market.

The winners of the competition were announced on September 16, 2010.

- Team Edison2 won the $5 million Mainstream competition with its four-passenger Very Light Car, obtaining 102.5 MPGe running on E85 fuel.
- Team Li-Ion Motors won the $2.5 million Alternative Side-by-Side competition with their aerodynamic Wave-II electric vehicle achieving 187 MPGe.
- Team X-Tracer Switzerland won the $2.5 million Alternative Tandem competition with their 205.3 MPGe faired electric motorcycle.

==== 2010–2011 Wendy Schmidt Oil Cleanup XCHALLENGE ====
The Wendy Schmidt Oil Cleanup XCHALLENGE was introduced on July 29, 2010. The $1 million prize had a goal to inspire a new generation of innovative solutions that will speed the pace of cleaning up seawater surface oil resulting from spillage from ocean platforms, tankers, and other sources. The team of Elastec/American Marine won the challenge by developing a device that skims oil off water three times faster than previously existing technology.

==== 2006–2009 Northrop Grumman Lunar Lander XCHALLENGE ====
The Northrop Grumman Lunar Lander XCHALLENGE (NGLLXPC) was a competition (co-hosted by NASA) to build precise, efficient small rocket systems. It was introduced in 2006 and the US$1 million top prize was awarded on November 5, 2009 to Masten Space Systems, led by David Masten; while Armadillo Aerospace, led by id Software founder John Carmack took home the second place prize of US$500,000, plus an additional $500,000 in 2008.

==== 2012–2014 The Nokia Sensing XCHALLENGE ====
The Nokia Sensing XCHALLENGE goal is accelerating the use of sensors and sensing technology to tackle health care problems and find ways for people to monitor and maintain their personal well-being. It was composed of two distinct Challenges held in 2013 and 2014. It was announced in 2012 and 12 finalists announced in 2013. On November 11, 2014, the winner was named to be team DMI, led by Eugene Y. Chan, MD, whose entry was the rHEALTH technology which used lasers and nanostrips to perform vast multiplexing on samples. In this competition, prize purses totaling $2.25 million were awarded.

==== 2013–2015 The Wendy Schmidt Ocean Health XPRIZE ====
The Wendy Schmidt Ocean Health XPRIZE is a $2 million competition to improve our understanding of ocean acidification. On July 20, 2015, the winners of the challenge were announced.

==== 2011–2017 Qualcomm Tricorder XPRIZE ====
The Qualcomm Tricorder XPRIZE was announced on May 10, 2011, and is sponsored by Qualcomm Foundation. It was officially launched on January 10, 2012. The $10 million prize is awarded for creating a mobile device that can "diagnose patients better than or equal to a panel of board certified physicians". The name is taken from the tricorder device in Star Trek which can be used to instantly diagnose ailments. No team met all the requirements needed to win the full prize purse. Reduced prizes were made to the strongest performers (US$2.6 million for Final Frontier Medical Devices, US$1 million for Dynamical Biomarkers, and $100,000 for Cloud DX, named "Bold Epic Innovator"). For the first time at any XPRIZE, the leftover funds from the main prize purse were diverted for consumer testing for commercialization ($3.8 million) and for adapting tricorders for use in hospitals in developing countries ($1.6 million).

==== 2016–2018 Anu & Naveen Jain Women's Safety XPRIZE ====
The Anu & Naveen Jain Women's Safety XPRIZE was launched on October 24, 2016, and had a $1 million prize. The goal for competing teams is to develop a safety device for women that can autonomously and inconspicuously trigger an emergency alert while transmitting information to a network of community responders. On June 7, 2018, Leaf Wearables received the grand prize winner of the $1M.

==== 2016–2018 Water Abundance XPRIZE ====
On October 20, 2018, the XPRIZE Foundation awarded The Water Abundance XPRIZE, which launched on October 24, 2016, with a purse of $1.75 million provided by the Tata Group and Australian Aid, to the Skysource/Skywater Alliance based in Venice, California, who received a grand prize of $1.5 million. An additional award of $150,000 went to the second place team, JMCC WING, based in South Point, Hawaii, to acknowledge the team's ingenuity in developing a unique technological approach. Over a 24-hour period, the Skysource/Skywater Alliance successfully extracted over 2,000 liters of water using only renewable energy, at a cost of US$0.02 per liter. The team, led by architect David Hertz, intends to use the award to productize the system to address water scarcity in the developing world.

==== 2014–2019 The Global Learning XPRIZE ====
The Global Learning XPRIZE, launched in September 2014, is a $15-million prize to create mobile apps to improve reading, writing, and arithmetic in developing nations. Each application will be developed during an 18-month period and the top five teams will receive $1 million each, with each of the winning apps being made available under an open-source license. The finalist of the group, that then develops an app producing the highest performance gains, will win an additional $10 million top prize. On May 15, 2019, the grand prize winners were announced; there was a tie between Kitkit School from South Korea and the United States, and one billion from Kenya and the United Kingdom.

==== 2015–2019 Shell Ocean Discovery XPRIZE ====
On December 14, 2015, XPRIZE Founder Peter Diamandis announced the launch of a new $7 million prize that will be a three-year global competition that challenges researchers to build better technologies for mapping Earth's seafloor. On May 31, 2019, the grand prize winner, receiving a total of $4M, was GEBCO-NF Alumni, an international team based in the United States, while KUROSHIO, from Japan, claimed $1M as the runner-up. GEBCO-NF Alumni used the unmanned boat Maxlimer to autonomously map 278 square kilometres (107 sq mi) of seafloor.

==== 2015–2019 Adult Literacy XPRIZE ====
The challenge set was to find or create solutions for improving the literacy proficiency of adults in reading within a 12-month period. The challenge was announced on June 8, 2015, and awarded $7 million by Barbara Bush Foundation for Family Literacy and the Dollar General Literacy Foundation. The winners, Learning Upgrade and People ForWords were announced February 7, 2019.

==== 2020 Rapid Covid Testing ====
XPRIZE Rapid Covid Testing was a $6 million, six-month competition to develop faster, cheaper, and easier to use COVID-19 testing methods at scale.

There were five co-winners: Reliable LFC, ChromaCode, Mirimus, La Jolla Institute for Immunology, and Alveo Technologies—"each delivering scalable, cost-effective testing solutions that improved global pandemic response."

==== 2020 Next-Gen Mask Challenge ====
The $1 million Next-Gen Mask Prize was open to only 16–24 year olds and was sponsored by Marc Benioff and Jim Cramer, the host of Mad Money on CNBC. On December 23, 2020, The Luminosity Lab was named the winning team with their anti-fog mask design, taking home $500,000.

==== 2016-2020 IBM Watson A.I. XPRIZE ====
The $5 million A.I. XPRIZE was announced as having the aim to use an artificial intelligence system to deliver a compelling TED talk. Diamandis hoped to contrast the benevolent value of AI against the dystopian point of view that sometimes enter AI conversations. The winning team of the contest, origninally scheduled for 2020, would be determined by the audience. The X Prize winners, announced June 23, 2021, were Zzapp Malaria in first place ($3 million), Aifred Health in second place ($1 million), and Marinus Analytics ($0.5 million).

==== 2015–2021 NRG Cosia Carbon XPRIZE ====
On September 29, 2015, Peter Diamandis, chairman and CEO of X Prize, announced the launch of a $20 million prize for a 4.5-year competition on testing technologies that converts CO_{2} into products with the highest net value to reduce carbon dioxide emissions of either coal or a natural gas power plant. Round three began in April 2018 as the 27 semifinalists were cut down to ten finalists; each is receiving an equal share of $5 million milestone prize money. Five teams will compete at a coal-fired power plant in Gillette, Wyoming. The remaining five teams will compete at a natural gas-fired power plant in Alberta, Canada. In February 2020 this operational round will conclude and winners will be announced the following month.

A delay occurred, and in April 2021, the winners were announced: CarbonCure Technologies (Canada) and CarbonBuilt (United States).

==== 2020–2021 Pandemic Response XPRIZE ====
This was a four-month challenge focused on the development of AI-driven systems to predict COVID-19 infection rates and to prescribe intervention plans. The $500,000 award was funded by Cognizant. The winners, VALENCIA IA4COVID19 from Spain and JSI vs COVID from Slovenia were announced on March 9, 2021.

==== 2018–2022 ANA Avatar XPRIZE ====
The $10M ANA Avatar XPRIZE aimed to create avatar systems that can transport human presence to remote locations in real time. The participants of this competition developed robotic systems that allow operators to see, hear, and interact with a remote environment in a way that feels as if they are truly there. On the other hand, people in the remote environment were given the impression that the operator was present inside the avatar robot. At the competition finals, held in November 2022 in Long Beach, CA, USA, the avatar systems were evaluated on their support for remotely interacting with humans, exploring new environments, and employing specialized skills. The winners of the competition were:

- Team NimbRo, University of Bonn, Germany won the grand prize of $5,000,000
- Pollen Robotics, France won $2,000,000
- Team Northeastern, Northeastern University, USA won $1,000,000

==== 2020-2024 Feed the next billion XPRIZE ====
In 2020, the XPRIZE "Feed the next billion" challenge was launched as a $15 million 3-year competition with the goal of developing authentic chicken breast or fish filet alternatives, made from non-animal based ingredients. Six teams competed in the finals in July 2024. No Grand Prize was awarded because the judges determined the minimum score requirements were not met by any of the finalists. The announcement led to a controversy about the XPRIZE evaluation criteria and was critizised by the remaining finalist teams.

==== 2021–2025 Gigaton Scale Carbon Removal ====
Funded by Elon Musk and the Musk Foundation, the $100 million carbon removal competition is the so far largest incentive prize in history. It is aimed "to inspire and help scale efficient solutions to collectively achieve the 10 gigaton per year carbon removal target by 2050, to help fight climate change and restore the Earth’s carbon balance".

In April 2022, XPRIZE and the Musk Foundation announced that in celebration of Earth Day, 15 teams had been designated as milestone winners in the $100 million XPRIZE carbon removal competition. The milestone winners have received $1 million each, with the overall winners to be awarded $80 million in 2025.

The Grand Prize was awarded to Mati Carbon, which "uses enhanced rock weathering—spreading crushed basalt on smallholder farms in India—to lock CO₂ as bicarbonate for millennia while enhancing soils and boosting crop yields."

=== Canceled contests ===
==== 2006–2013 Archon Genomics XPRIZE ====
The Archon Genomics XPRIZE, the second XPRIZE to be offered by the foundation, was announced on October 4, 2006. The goal of the Archon Genomics XPRIZE was to greatly reduce the cost and increase the speed of human genome sequencing to create a new era of personalized, predictive, and preventive medicine, eventually transforming medical care from reactive to proactive. The $10 million prize purse was promised to the first team that can build a device and use it to sequence 100 human genomes within 10 days or less, with an accuracy of no more than one error in every 100,000 bases sequenced, with sequences accurately covering at least 98% of the genome, and at a recurring cost of no more than $1,000 per genome.

If more than one team attempted the competition at the same time, and more than one team fulfilled all the criteria, then teams would have been ranked according to the time of completion. No more than three teams would have been ranked and would have shared the purse in the following manner: $7.5 million to the winner and $2.5 million to the second place team if two teams were successful, or $7 million, $2 million and $1 million if three teams are successful.

Actual competition events were originally scheduled to occur twice a year, with all eligible teams given the opportunity to attempt, starting at precisely the same time as the other teams. This was changed to a single competition scheduled for September 5, 2013, to October 1, 2013, which was canceled on August 22, 2013. The CEO articulated the rationale for the change, "companies can do this for less than $5,000 per genome, in a few days or less – and are moving quickly towards the goals we set for the prize. For this reason, we have decided to cancel an XPRIZE for the first time ever." A public debate concerning the validity and potential implications of the cancellation was published March 27, 2014.

==== 2007–2018 Google Lunar XPRIZE ====
The Google Lunar XPRIZE was introduced on September 13, 2007. The goal of the prize was similar to that of the Ansari XPRIZE, to inspire a new generation of private investment in space exploration and technology. The challenge called for teams to compete in successfully launching, landing, and operating a rover on the lunar surface. The prize would award $20 million to the first team to land a rover on the Moon that successfully roved more than 500 meters and transmitted back high-definition images and video. There was a $5 million second prize, as well as $5 million in potential bonus prizes for extra features such as roving long distances (greater than 5,000 meters), capturing images of man-made objects on the Moon, or surviving a lunar night.

On January 23, 2018, the prize ended when no team could schedule, confirm, and pay for a launch attempt. The XPRIZE Foundation announced that "no team would be able to make a launch attempt to reach the Moon by the March 31, 2018 deadline... and the US $30 million Google Lunar XPRIZE will go unclaimed."

==== 2019-2024 Rainforest XPRIZE ====
On November 19, 2019, the $10 million Rainforest XPrize was announced. Registration opened in February 2020 and the first round will began in September 2020. On November 18, 2024, the winning teams were announced. Limelight Rainforest won the $5 million first place award, Map of Life Rapid Assessments won the $2 million second place award, the Brazilian Team won the $1 million third place award, and a special award of $250,000 for integration of technology and outreach was awarded to ETH BiodivX.

=== Active contests ===
==== 2023 XPRIZE Healthspan ====
In November 2023, XPRIZE announced the largest prize to date of $101 million for medical interventions targeting the biology of aging that show a restoration of 10 or more years of function in muscle, cognitive, and immune clinical endpoints. Winners are planned to be announced at the end of 2030.

== See also ==
- DARPA Grand Challenge
- Elevator:2010
- Global Security Challenge
- H-Prize
- Hutter Prize
- Inducement prize contest
- L Prize
- Methuselah prize
- Orteig Prize
