= Virgin Galactic =

Space tourism company

IATA	ICAO	Call sign
–	VGX	GALACTIC
- Founded: 2004; 22 years ago
- Operating bases: Spaceport America; Mojave Air and Space Port
- Fleet size: ▼1 (mothership vehicle) (2024)
- Destinations: 1 (Space)
- Traded as: NYSE: SPCE; Russell 2000 component
- Headquarters: Tustin, California, U.S
- Key people: Michael Colglazier (CEO); Doug Ahrens (CFO); Mike Moses (President – Safety)
- Founder: Richard Branson
- Revenue: ▼US$2.31 million (2022)
- Operating income: ▼US$−500 million (2022)
- Net income: ▼US$−500 million (2022)
- Total assets: ▲US$1.14 billion (2022)
- Total equity: ▼US$480 million (2022)
- Employees: 1,166 (2022)
- Website: virgingalactic.com

Notes
- Financials as of December 31, 2022.

Virgin Galactic Holdings, Inc. is a British-American spaceflight company founded by Richard Branson and the Virgin Group conglomerate, which retains an 11.9% stake through Virgin Investments Limited.

Headquartered in California with launches in New Mexico, the company develops commercial spacecraft and provides suborbital spaceflights to space tourists. Virgin Galactic's suborbital spacecraft are air-launched from beneath a carrier airplane, White Knight Two. As of 2026, twelve Virgin Galactic flights have exceeded 50 miles (80 km) altitude, entering outer space by US standards, (Note: The 50 mi (80 km) standard is used by NASA, the US Air Force, and the Federal Aviation Administration. The internationally-recognized standard is the Karman line at 100 km (62 mi).) all with VSS Unity spaceship since 2018.

The company also spun off its under-development LauncherOne rocket, an air-launched satellite launch vehicle, to Virgin Orbit in 2017. Virgin Orbit was subsequently shut down in 2023.

On 13 December 2018, VSS Unity made the project's first suborbital space flight, VSS Unity VP-03. Its two pilots reached an altitude of 82.7 kilometres (51.4 mi). In February 2019, the project carried three people, including a passenger, on VSS Unity VF-01; the spacecraft reached 89.9 kilometres (55.9 mi) and one member of the team floated within the cabin. On 11 July 2021, Branson and three employees rode on VSS Unity 22 as passengers, the first time a spaceflight-company founder travelled on his own ship into outer space.

In February 2022, Virgin Galactic began selling tickets to the public for $450,000 apiece. The first such flight, Galactic 01, took place in June 2023. One year later, Unity made its final flight, Galactic 07; the company shifted focus to its Delta-class vehicles and a higher launch cadence.

In February 2025, a ticket for a seat was estimated to cost about $600,000. In 2026, the company resumed taking reservations for seats at $1000, for a ticket price of $750,000.

== Structure and history ==
=== Formation and early activities ===
Virgin Galactic was founded in 2004 by British entrepreneur Sir Richard Branson, who had previously founded the Virgin Group and the Virgin Atlantic airline, and who had a long personal history of balloon and surface record-breaking activities.

=== The Spaceship Company ===
The Spaceship Company (TSC) was founded by Richard Branson through Virgin Group (which owned 70%) and Burt Rutan through Scaled Composites (which owned 30%) to build commercial spaceships and launch aircraft for space travel. From the time of TSC's formation in 2005, the launch customer was Virgin Galactic, which contracted to purchase five SpaceShipTwos and two WhiteKnightTwos. Scaled Composites was contracted to develop and build the initial prototypes of WhiteKnightTwo and SpaceShipTwo, and then TSC began production of the follow-on vehicles beginning in 2008. In 2012, after Northrop Grumman acquired Scaled Composites, Virgin Galactic acquired the remaining 30% of The Spaceship Company.

=== Investors ===
After a claimed investment by Virgin Group of US$100 million, in 2010 the sovereign wealth fund of Abu Dhabi, Aabar Investments group, acquired a 31.8% stake in Virgin Galactic for US$280 million, receiving exclusive regional rights to launch tourism and scientific research space flights from the United Arab Emirates capital. In July 2011, Aabar invested a further US$110 million to develop a program to launch small satellites into low Earth orbit, raising their equity share to 37.8%. The New Mexico government has invested approximately $200 M (£121 M) in the Spaceport America facility, for which Virgin Galactic is the anchor tenant; other commercial space companies also use the site.

On Monday, October 28, 2019, Virgin Galactic listed on the New York Stock Exchange, trading under the ticker symbol 'SPCE', the first publicly traded space tourism company. The company raised $450 million through a SPAC merger listing, and the company's market value after listing was more than $2.4 billion. At the time, the company claimed to have over 600 customer reservations representing approximately $80 million in total collected deposits and more than $120 million in "potential revenue".

== Aims ==
=== Early history and background ===
The Ansari X Prize was a space competition in which the X Prize Foundation offered a US$10,000,000 prize for the first non-government organization to launch a reusable crewed spacecraft into space twice within two weeks. It was modeled after early 20th-century aviation prizes, and aimed to spur development of low-cost spaceflight.

Created in May 1996 and initially called just the "X Prize", it was renamed the "Ansari X Prize" on 6 May 2004 following a multimillion-dollar donation from entrepreneurs Anousheh Ansari and Amir Ansari.

The prize was won on 4 October 2004, the 47th anniversary of the Sputnik 1 launch, by the Tier One project designed by Burt Rutan and financed by Microsoft co-founder Paul Allen, using the experimental spaceplane SpaceShipOne. $10 million was awarded to the winner, and more than $100 million was invested in new technologies in pursuit of the prize.

=== Overview of the flights to be developed ===
The spacecraft initially called SpaceShipTwo was planned to achieve a suborbital journey with a short period of weightlessness. Carried to about 16 kilometers, or 52,000 ft, underneath a carrier aircraft, White Knight Two, after separation the vehicle was to continue to over 100 km (the Kármán line, a common definition of where "space" begins). The time from liftoff of the White Knight Two mothership carrying SpaceShipTwo until the touchdown of the spacecraft after the suborbital flight would be about 2.5 hours. The suborbital flight itself would be only a small fraction of that time, with weightlessness lasting approximately 6 minutes. Passengers were to be able to release themselves from their seats during these six minutes and float around the cabin.

== Development operations ==
=== 2007 Scaled Composites fuel tank testing explosion ===
In July 2007, three Scaled Composites employees were killed and three critically injured at the Mojave spaceport while testing components of the rocket motor for SpaceShipTwo. An explosion occurred during a cold fire test, which involved nitrous oxide flowing through fuel injectors. The procedure had been expected to be safe.

=== Commencement of sub-space test flights ===
Just a year later, in July 2008, Richard Branson predicted the maiden space voyage would take place within 18 months. In October 2009, Virgin Galactic announced that initial flights would take place from Spaceport America "within two years." Later that year, Scaled Composites announced that White Knight Two's first SpaceShipTwo captive flights would be in early 2010. Both aircraft did fly together in March 2010. The credibility of the earlier promises of launch dates by Virgin Galactic were brought into question in October 2014 by its chief executive, George T. Whitesides, when he told The Guardian: "We've changed dramatically as a company. When I joined in 2010 we were mostly a marketing organisation. Right now we can design, build, test, and fly a rocket motor all by ourselves and all in Mojave, which I don't think is done anywhere else on the planet".

On 7 December 2009, SpaceShipTwo was unveiled at the Mojave Spaceport. Branson told the 300 people attending, each of whom had booked rides at $200,000 each, that flights would begin "in 2011." However, in April 2011, Branson announced further delays, saying "I hope 18 months from now, we'll be sitting in our spaceship and heading off into space." By February 2012, SpaceShipTwo had completed 15 test flights attached to White Knight Two and an additional 16 glide tests, the last of which took place in September 2011. A rocket-powered test flight of SpaceShipTwo took place on 29 April 2013, with an engine burn of 16 seconds duration. The brief flight began at an altitude of 47,000 feet (14,000 m) and reached a maximum altitude of 55,000 feet (17,000 m). While the SS2 achieved a speed of Mach 1.2 (920 mph (1,480 km/h)), this was less than half the 2,000 mph (3,200 km/h) speed predicted by Richard Branson. SpaceShipTwo's second supersonic flight achieved a speed of 1,100 mph (1,800 km/h) for 20 seconds; while this was an improvement, it fell far short of the 2,500 mph (4,000 km/h) for 70 seconds required to carry six passengers into space. However, Branson still announced his spaceship would be capable of "launching 100 satellites every day."

In addition to the suborbital passenger business, Virgin Galactic intended to market SpaceShipTwo for suborbital space science missions and market White Knight Two for "small satellite" launch services. It had planned to initiate RFPs for the satellite business in early 2010, but flights had not materialized as of 2014.

On 14 May 2013, Richard Branson stated on Virgin Radio Dubai's Kris Fade Morning Show that he would be aboard the first public flight of SpaceShipTwo, which had again been rescheduled, this time to 25 December 2013. "Maybe I'll dress up as Father Christmas", Branson said. The third rocket-powered test flight of SpaceShipTwo took place on 10 January 2014 and successfully tested the spaceship's Reaction Control System (RCS) and the newly installed thermal protection coating on the vehicle's tail booms. Virgin Galactic CEO George Whitesides said "We are progressively closer to our target of starting commercial service in 2014". Interviewed by The Observer at the time of her 90th birthday in July 2014, Branson's mother, Eve, told reporter Elizabeth Day of her intention of going to space herself. Asked when that might be, she replied: "I think it's the end of the year", adding after a pause, "It's always 'the end of the year' ".

In February 2014, cracks in WhiteKnightTwo, where the spars connect with the fuselage, were discovered during an inspection conducted after Virgin Galactic took possession of the aircraft from builder Scaled Composites.

In September 2014, Richard Branson described the intended date for the first commercial flight as February or March 2015; by the time of this announcement, a new plastic-based fuel had yet to be ignited in-flight. By September 2014, the three test flights of the SS2 had only reached an altitude of around 71,000 ft (22,000 m), approximately 13 miles; in order to receive a Federal Aviation Administration license to carry passengers, the craft needs to complete test missions at full speed and 100 km, 62 mi height. Following the announcement of further delays, UK newspaper The Sunday Times reported that Branson faced a backlash from those who had booked flights with Virgin Galactic, with the company having received $80 million in fares and deposits. Tom Bower, author of Branson: The Man behind the Mask, told the Sunday Times: "They spent 10 years trying to perfect one engine and failed. They are now trying to use a different engine and get into space in six months. It's just not feasible." BBC science editor David Shukman commented in October 2014, that "[Branson's] enthusiasm and determination [are] undoubted. But his most recent promises of launching the first passenger trip by the end of this year had already started to look unrealistic some months ago."

=== VSS Enterprise crash ===
At 10:51 PST 31 October 2014, the fourth rocket-powered test flight of the company's first SpaceShipTwo craft, VSS Enterprise, ended in disaster, as it broke apart in mid-air, with the debris falling into the Mojave desert in California, shortly after being released from the mothership. Initial reports attributed the loss to an unidentified "in-flight anomaly". The flight was the first test of SpaceShipTwo with new plastic-based fuel, replacing the original—a rubber-based solid fuel that had not met expectations. 39-year-old co-pilot Michael Alsbury was killed and 43-year-old pilot Peter Siebold was seriously injured.

==== Investigation ====
Initial investigations found the engine and propellant tanks were intact, showing there had not been a fuel explosion. Telemetry data and cockpit video showed that the air braking system appeared to have deployed incorrectly and too early, for unknown reasons, and the craft had violently broken apart in mid-air seconds later.

U.S. National Transportation Safety Board Chairman Christopher Hart said on 2 November 2014 that investigators had determined SpaceShipTwo's tail system was supposed to have been released for deployment as the craft was traveling about 1.4 times the speed of sound; instead, the tail section began pivoting when the vehicle was flying at Mach 1. He noted that it was also unclear how the tail mechanism began to rotate once it was unlocked, since that maneuver requires a separate pilot command that was never given, and whether the craft's position in the air and its speed somehow enabled the tail section to swing free on its own.

At a hearing in Washington D.C. on 28 July 2015, and a press release on the same day the NTSB cited inadequate design safeguards, poor pilot training, lack of rigorous FAA oversight and a potentially anxious co-pilot without recent flight experience as important factors in the 2014 crash. They determined that the co-pilot, who died in the accident, prematurely unlocked a movable tail section some ten seconds after SpaceShip Two fired its rocket engine and was breaking the sound barrier, resulting in the craft's breaking apart. But the board also found that the Scaled Composites unit of Northrop Grumman, which designed and flew the prototype space tourism vehicle, did not properly prepare for potential human errors by providing a fail-safe system that could have guarded against premature deployment.

NTSB Chairman Christopher Hart emphasized that consideration of human factors, which was not emphasized in the design, safety assessment, and operation of SpaceShipTwo's feather system, was critical to safe human spaceflight to mitigate the potential consequences of human error. In its submission to the NTSB, Virgin Galactic reported that the second SS2, at the time nearing completion, had been modified with an automatic mechanical inhibit device to prevent locking or unlocking of the feather during safety-critical phases. An explicit warning about the dangers of premature unlocking had also been added to the checklist and operating handbook, and a formalized crew resource management (CRM) approach, already used by Virgin for its WK2 operations, was being adopted for SS2. However, despite CRM issues being cited as a likely contributing cause, Virgin confirmed that it would not modify the cockpit display system.

While Virgin had been pursuing the development of a smallsat launch vehicle since 2012, the company began in 2015 to make the smallsat launch business a larger part of Virgin's core business plan, as the Virgin human spaceflight program had experienced multiple delays. This part of the business was spun off into a new company called Virgin Orbit in 2017.

=== VSS Unity ===
Following the crash of VSS Enterprise, the replacement SpaceShipTwo named VSS Unity was rolled out on 19 February 2016. Test flights were set to begin after ground tests completed in August 2016. VSS Unity completed its first flight (first free flight; captive carry flights had taken place since September 2016), a successful glide test, in December 2016. The glide lasted ten minutes. By January 2018, seven glide tests had been completed, and on 5 April 2018 it performed a powered test flight, the first since 2014. By July 2018, Unity had gone considerably higher and faster in its testing program than had its predecessor. On 13 December 2018, VSS Unity reached a height of 82.7 km (51.4 mi) above the Earth at speeds close to three times the speed of sound. The two pilots, Mark "Forger" Stucky and Frederick "CJ" Sturckow earned commercial astronaut wings from the US government for the accomplishment. Another flight in February 2019 carried third crew member (1 in the passenger cabin) for the first time.

After transfer to Spaceport America in New Mexico in February 2020, a couple of 15 km altitude test flights were carried out. Due to a surge in the number of COVID-19 cases in New Mexico, Virgin Galactic had to postpone a key test flight of its spacecraft in November 2020, and then in December 2020, a computer connection issue prevented engine ignition. On 22 May 2021, VSS Unity flew its sixth powered test flight reaching an altitude of 89 km (55 mi). This suborbital flight marked the first ever human space flight from New Mexico; it was piloted by CJ Sturkow (pilot-in-command) and Dave MacKay. The VSS Unity was carried to 13,000 m (44,000 ft) by the jet powered launch aircraft Mothership Eve, where it was released to reach its suborbital altitude over New Mexico. A fully crewed test flight took place on 11 July 2021 with two pilots Dave Mackay and Michael Masucci and the four passengers were Richard Branson, Beth Moses, Colin Bennett and Sirisha Bandla. The flight was initially claimed to be successful but it was later revealed Unity briefly stepped outside the airspace that had been reserved for it and the FAA were not informed as required. The FAA grounded Virgin Galactic's space planes before allowing a resumption of flights after some changes to procedures including reserving a larger volume of airspace.

On 14 October 2021, Virgin Galactic announced that an upgrade program for Unity and Eve would begin, delaying future commercial flights to mid 2022. This followed material analysis that required further analysis.

=== Spaceship III ===
The first Spaceship III, VSS Imagine, was rolled out on 30 March 2021 and it was indicated there is ground testing to do before glide test flights should commence not earlier than Summer 2021.

=== Delta Class ===
The first Delta Class spaceship, VSS Apeiron, was unveiled on 28 October 2026, and flown to Spaceport America. Customer flights are projected to resume in 2027, while a second Delta spaceplane is under construction.

== List of launches ==
=== SpaceShipTwo ===
==== VSS Enterprise flights ====
===== Legend =====
Code	Detail
GFxx	Glide Flight
CCxx	Captive Carry Flight
CFxx	Cold Flow Flight
PFxx	Powered Flight
Fxx	Feathering deployed

===== Flights =====
Flight designation	Date	Duration	Maximum altitude	Top speed	Pilot / co-pilot	Notes
41 / GF01	10 October 2010	13 min	46,000 feet (14,000 m)	180 knots (210 mph; 330 km/h) EAS 2 g	Siebold / Alsbury	
44 / GF02	28 October 2010	10 min, 51 sec		230 knots (260 mph; 430 km/h) EAS 3 g	Stucky / Alsbury	
45 / GF03	17 November 2010	11 min, 39 sec		246 knots (283 mph; 456 km/h) EAS 3.5 g	Siebold / Nichols	
47 / GF04	13 January 2011	11 min, 34 sec		250 knots (290 mph; 460 km/h) EAS 3.8 g	Stucky / Nichols	
56 / GF05	22 April 2011	14 min, 31 sec			Siebold / Shane	
57 / GF06	27 April 2011	16 min, 7 sec			Stucky / Alsbury	
58 / GF07	4 May 2011	11 min, 5 sec	51,500 feet (15,700 m)	15,500 feet per minute (4,700 m/min)	Siebold / Nichols	F01
59 / GF08	10 May 2011	13 min, 2 sec			Stucky / Shane	
60 / GF09	19 May 2011	11 min, 32 sec			Siebold / Binnie	
61 / GF10	25 May 2011	10 min, 14 sec	Above 50,000 feet (15,000 m)		Stucky / Binnie	F02
62 / (CC12)	9 June 2011				Siebold / Shane	Release failure during flight intended as GF11
64 / GF11	14 June 2011	13 min, 18 sec			Siebold / Shane	
65 / GF12	15 June 2011	10 min, 32 sec			Stucky / Nichols	
66 / GF13	21 June 2011	8 min, 55 sec			Siebold / Nichols	
67 / GF14	23 June 2011	7 min, 33 sec			Stucky / Nichols	
68 / GF15	27 June 2011	7 min, 39 sec			Siebold / Binnie	
73 / GF16	29 September 2011	7 min, 15 sec			Stucky / Nichols / Persall	F03
87 / GF17	26 June 2012	11 min, 22 sec			Siebold / Alsbury	
88 / GF18	29 June 2012	13 min			Stucky / Mackay	
90 / GF19	18 July 2012	10 min, 39 sec			Siebold / Nichols	
91 / GF20	2 August 2012	8 min			Stucky / Nichols	F04
92 / GF21	7 August 2012	9 min, 52 sec			Siebold / Colmer	F05
93 / GF22	11 August 2012	8 min, 2 sec			Stucky / Binnie	
109 / GF23	19 December 2012	13 min, 24 sec			Stucky / Alsbury	
113 / GF24	3 April 2013	9 min			Stucky / Nichols	F06
114 / CF01	12 April 2013	10 min, 48 sec			Stucky / Alsbury	
115 / PF01	29 April 2013	13 min	56,000 feet (17,000 m)	Mach 1.22	Stucky / Alsbury	
130 / GF25	25 July 2013	11 min, 52 sec			Stucky / Mackay	
131 / GF26	8 August 2013	10 min			Stucky / Mackay	F07
132 / PF02	5 September 2013	14 min	69,000 feet (21,000 m)	Mach 1.43	Stucky / Nichols	F08
141 / GF27	11 December 2013.	11 min			Stucky / Masucci	
147 / PF03	10 January 2014	12 min, 43 sec	72,000 feet (22,000 m)	Mach 1.4	Mackay / Stucky	F09
149 / GF28	17 January 2014	14 min, 12 sec			Siebold / Sturckow	
156 / GF29	29 July 2014	12 min			Masucci / Siebold	
164 / CF02	28 August 2014	13 min			Siebold / Alsbury	
170 / GF30	7 October 2014	10 min, 30 sec			Siebold / Sturckow	F10
?? / PF04	31 October 2014	0 min, 13 sec	roughly 50,000 feet (15,000 m)	? (at least Mach 0.92)	Siebold / Alsbury	Unintended feathering destroys vehicle in-flight

==== VSS Unity flights ====
===== Legend =====
Code	Detail
GFxx	Glide Flight
CCxx	Captive Carry Flight
CFxx	Cold Flow Flight
PFxx	Powered Flight
Fxx	Feathering deployed

===== Flights =====
Flight designation	Date	Duration	Maximum altitude	Top speed	Pilot / co-pilot / passengers	Notes
01 / CC01	8 September 2016		15.2 km (50,000 ft)		Stucky / Mackay	
02 / CC02	1 November 2016					Strong winds, no release during flight intended as GF01
03 / CC03	3 November 2016					Strong winds, no release during second attempt at GF01
04 / CC04	30 November 2016					Test of minor modifications
05 / GF01	3 December 2016	10 minutes	16.8 km (55,000 ft)	Mach 0.6	Stucky / Mackay	First Glide Flight
06 / GF02	22 December 2016				Stucky / Mackay	
07 / GF03	24 February 2017				Sturckow / Mackay	3rd Glide Flight
08 / GF04	1 May 2017				Stucky / Masucci	F01
09 / CF01	1 June 2017				Mackay / Sturckow	
10 / GF06	4 August 2017				Mackay / Sturckow	First flight with major propulsion components aboard.
11 / GF07	11 January 2018			Mach 0.9	Stucky / Masucci	
12 / PF01	5 April 2018		25.7 km (84,300 ft)	Mach 1.87	Stucky / Mackay	F02
13 / PF02	29 May 2018		34.9 km (114,501 ft)	Mach 1.9	Mackay / Stucky	Test of changed center of gravity as passenger seats carried for first time. F03
14 / PF03	26 July 2018		52.1 km (170,800 ft)	Mach 2.47	Mackay / Masucci	Reached Mesosphere for first time.
15 / VP-03	13 December 2018		82.7 km (271,330 ft)	Mach 2.9	Stucky / Sturckow	Reached outer space for first time according to the US definition of the space border.
16 / VF-01	22 February 2019		89.9 km (295,007 ft)	Mach 3.04	Mackay / Masucci / Moses	Carried third crew member (1 in the passenger cabin) for the first time
17 / GF08	1 May 2020		15.24 km (50,000 ft)	Mach 0.7	Mackay / Sturckow	First flight from New Mexico
18 / GF09	25 June 2020		15.54 km (51,000 ft)	Mach 0.85	Stucky / Masucci	
19	12 December 2020				Mackay / Sturckow	First attempted crewed spaceflight from New Mexico, aborted due to computer malfunction, engine ignited and automatically turned off.
21 / VF-03	22 May 2021		89.23 km (55.45 mi)		Mackay / Sturckow	First crewed spaceflight (above 50 miles) from New Mexico
22	11 July 2021		86.1 km (53.5 mi)		Mackay / Masucci / Sirisha Bandla, Colin Bennett, Beth Moses, Richard Branson	First fully crewed (Note: The SpaceShipTwo vehicles (like VSS Unity) were originally designed for 8 people, 6 passengers and 2 pilots, so whether this flight was fully-crewed is debatable. But it is true that at the time of this flight, only 6 seats (4 passengers, 2 pilots) were installed in VSS Unity, so in this sense this flight was fully-crewed. Also, no SpaceShipTwo vehicle, VSS Unity in particular, ever had more than 6 seats installed and never flew with more than 6 people (2 pilots, 4 passengers) onboard, so in this sense this flight was also fully-crewed.) flight included Richard Branson.
24 / GF10	26 April 2023	9 minutes	13.5 km (47,000 ft)		Sturckow / Pecile	
25	25 May 2023	14 minutes	87.2 km (54.2 mi)	Mach 2.94	Masucci / Sturckow / Moses / Mays / Gilbert / Huie	
Galactic 01	29 June 2023	13:50 minutes	85.1 km (52.9 mi)	Mach 2.88	Masucci / Pecile / Villadei / Carlucci / Pandolfi / Bennett	First VSS Unity commercial service flight, carrying members of the Italian Air Force.
Galactic 02	10 August 2023	15:38 minutes	88.5 km (55.0 mi)	Mach 3.00	Sturckow / Latimer / Moses / Goodwin / Schahaff / Mayers	First VSS Unity flight carrying a private astronaut.
Galactic 03	8 September 2023	12:37 minutes	88.6 km (55.1 mi)	Mach 2.95	Masucci / Pecile / Moses / Baxter / Reynard / Nash	
Galactic 04	6 October 2023	14:23 minutes	87.4 km (54.3 mi)	Mach 2.95	Latimer / Sturckow / Moses / Rosano / Beattie / Salim	
Galactic 05	2 November 2023	14:20 minutes	87.2 km (54.2 mi)	Mach 2.96	Masucci / Latimer / Bennett / Stern / Gerardi / Maisonrouge	
Galactic 06	26 January 2024		88.8 km (55.2 mi)	Mach 2.98	Sturckow / Pecile / Borozdina / Vaughn / Haider / Kornswiet	
Galactic 07	8 June 2024		87.5 km (54.4 mi)	Mach 2.96	Pecile / Janjua / Atasever/ Manenti /Pergament / Sadhwani	Final powered flight
33 / GF11	27 May 2026				Masucci / Alix	Return to flight, training glide flight
34 / GF12	16 September 2026				Sturckow / Edgell	Training glide flight
35 / GF13	7 October 2026				Janjua / Pecile	Training glide flight

== Collaborations ==
=== NASA ===
In February 2007, Virgin announced that they had signed a memorandum of understanding with NASA to explore the potential for collaboration, which produced contracts in 2011 of up to $4.5 million for research flights. As of 2026, Virgin remains a contracted vehicle flight services and government supported research provider for the space agency.

=== OneWeb satellite Internet access provider ===
Virgin Group in January 2015 announced an investment into the OneWeb satellite constellation providing world Internet access service of WorldVu. Virgin Galactic would take a share of the launch contracts to launch the satellites into their 1,200 km (750 mi) orbits. The prospective launches were to use the LauncherOne system. In 2017 the LauncherOne business was spun off into Virgin Orbit, which ceased operations in 2023 following bankruptcy.

=== Collaboration with Boom Technology ===
Virgin Galactic and the Virgin Group collaborated with Boom Technology in order to create a new supersonic passenger transporter as a successor to the Concorde. This new supersonic plane would fly at Mach 2.2 (similar to Concorde) for a 3-hour trans-Atlantic flight (half of standard), projected to cost $2,500–10,000 per seat (half of Concorde) for a load of 45 passengers (the Concorde held 100). It was anticipated that with the accumulation of knowledge since the design of Concorde, the new plane would be safer and cheaper with better fuel economy, operating costs, and aerodynamics. Boom would collaborate with Virgin's The Spaceship Company for design, engineering, and flight-test support, and manufacturing.

The initial model would be the Boom Technology XB-1 "Baby Boom" Supersonic Demonstrator 1/3-size prototype. It would be capable of trans-Pacific flight, LA-to-Sydney in 6.75 hours, traveling at 2,335 km/h (1,451 mph). XB-1 would be equipped with General Electric J85 engines, Honeywell avionics, with composite structures fabricated by Blue Force using TenCate Advanced Composites carbon fibre products. Virgin Galactic had optioned 10 units. These options expired in 2020.

=== Collaboration with Under Armour ===
On 24 January 2019, Virgin Galactic announced a partnership with Under Armour for the fabrication of space suits for passengers and pilots of SpaceShipTwo. Under Armour would also create uniforms for Virgin Galactic employees working at Spaceport America. The full range known as the UA | VG (Under Armour | Virgin Galactic) built with UA's new Intelliknit fabric was revealed later, ahead of Richard Branson's inaugural commercial flight. This range included a base layer, the space suit and footwear. It was said that the base layer would enhance performance and blood flow during the high and zero G portions of flight and the liner of the spacesuit was made of new fabrics such as Tencel Luxe, SpinIt and Nomex, used for temperature control and moisture management.

=== Collaboration with Purdue University ===
On 23 September 2025, Virgin Galactic announced a partnership with Purdue University for a Virgin Galactic suborbital spaceflight with a crew consisting of exclusively Purdue-associated people. The flight is dubbed "Purdue 1" and plans to fly in 2027 with a five-person crew consisting of Purdue faculty, students and alumni. The crew members are professor Steven Collicott, graduate student Abigail Mizzi, alumnus Jason Williamson, alumnus Florence Stahura, and alumnus and veteran commercial astronaut Beth Moses. Experiments conducted during the flight are planned to include autonomous experiments in quantum technology and in-space chip manufacturing, and crew-monitored experiments on zero-gravity oscillations of liquids set in motion by rotation. The latter experiments will be monitored by Collicott and Mizzi as a part of a graduate research project.

=== Announced Future Collaborations ===
- Operation Period, Spaceflight to study menstruation in microgravity

== Personnel and passengers ==
=== Key personnel ===
David Mackay, former RAF test pilot, was named chief pilot for Virgin Galactic in 2011 and chief test-pilot. Steve Isakowitz was appointed as Virgin Galactic's president in June 2013. In October 2016, Mike Moses replaced Steve Isakowitz as president; Isakowitz moved to Aerospace Corp. to become president and CEO; Moses was promoted from VP Operations, and was once a NASA flight director and shuttle integration manager.

=== Personnel ===
- Founder: Richard Branson
- Interim Chairman: Ray Mabus
- CEO: Michael Colglazier
- CFO: Doug Ahrens
- President – Safety: Mike Moses

=== Pilot corps ===
- Chief pilot: Dave "Mac" Mackay
- Chief flight instructor: Mike "Sooch" Masucci
- Test pilot: Kelly Latimer
- Pilot: Rick "CJ" Sturckow
- Pilot: Nicola Pecile
- Chief space flight participant instructor: Beth Moses
- Space flight participant instructor: Colin Bennett

== Aircraft and spacecraft ==
=== Motherships ===
==== White Knight Two ====
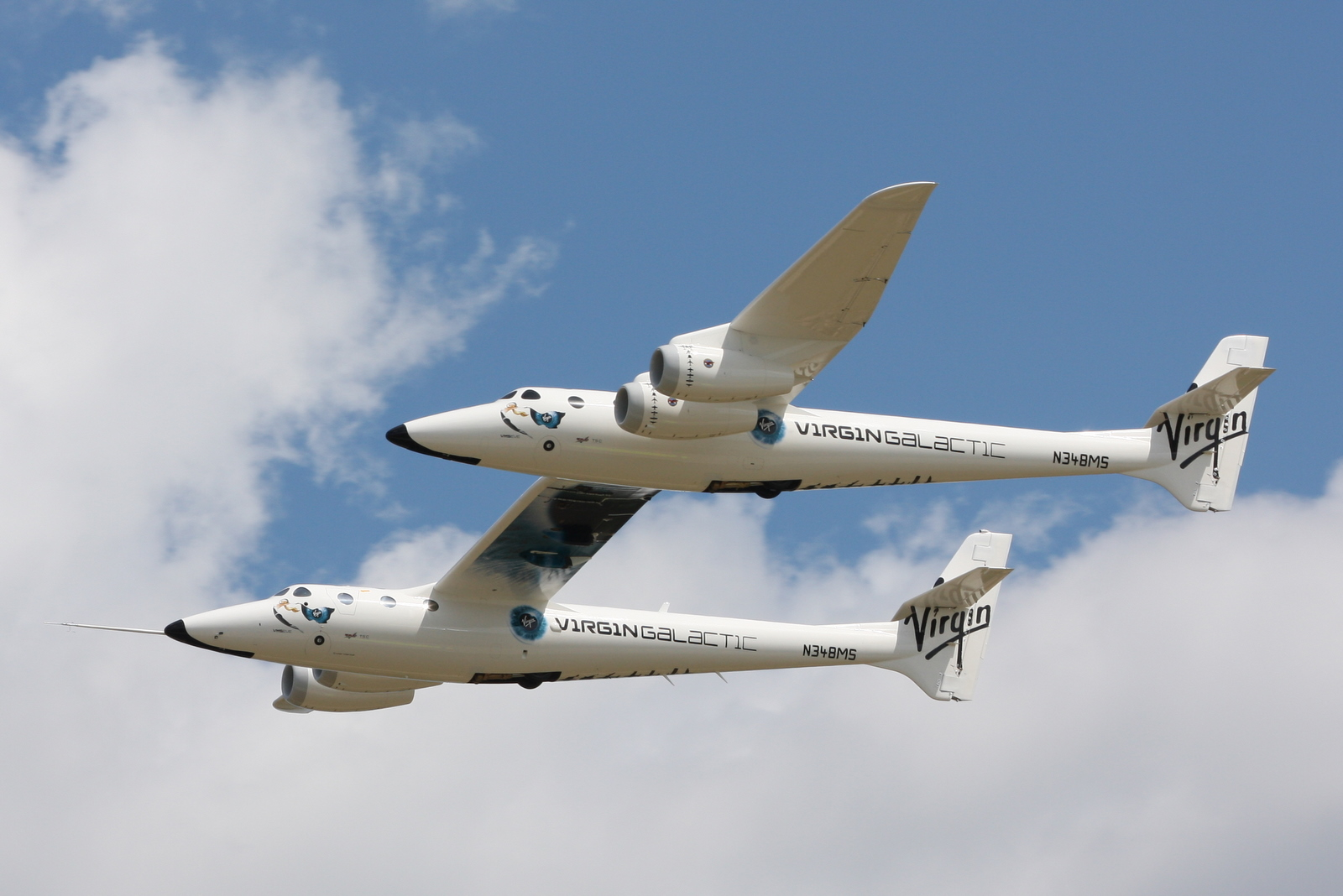
White Knight Two in the air

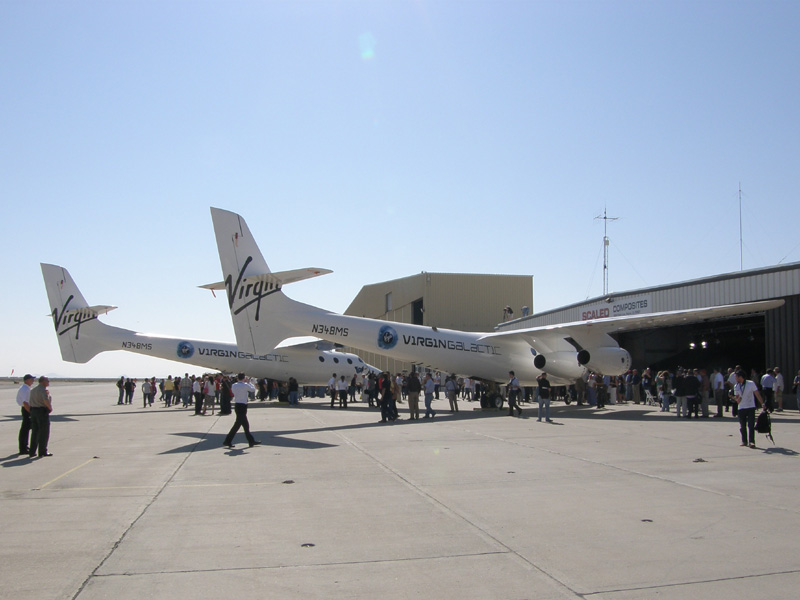
White Knight Two on the ground

The White Knight Two is a special airplane built as the mothership and launch-platform for the spacecraft SpaceShipTwo and the uncrewed launch vehicle LauncherOne (LauncherOne never launched from underneath a White Knight Two). The mothership is a large fixed-wing aircraft with two hulls linked together by a central wing. Two aircraft were planned – VMS Eve and VMS Spirit of Steve Fossett. On 22 May 2021 Mothership Eve was used to carry VSS Unity to a launch altitude of 13,000 m (44,000 ft).

==== Boeing 747 ====
The LauncherOne system used a Boeing 747-400 aircraft, renamed Spirit of Mojave, which was acquired from Virgin Atlantic. This was spun off into Virgin Orbit with the LauncherOne business in 2017.

==== Generation II mothership ====
Virgin Galactic plans to have generation 2 motherships ready for 2025, for the next-generation Delta-class spaceplanes. In July 2022, Virgin announced it would partner with Boeing's Aurora Flight Sciences to design and build the next generation of mothership.

Boeing ended work on the contract in 2023 and has now filed suit against Virgin Galactic over unpaid bills according to a report in SpaceNews. The lawsuit was settled in 2024.

=== Spaceships ===
==== SpaceShip Two ====
Richard Branson unveiled the rocket plane on 7 December 2009, announcing that, after testing, the plane would carry fare-paying passengers ticketed for short duration journeys just above the atmosphere. Virgin Group would initially launch from a base in New Mexico before extending operations around the globe. Built from lightweight carbon-composite materials and powered by a hybrid rocket motor, SS2 was based on the Ansari X Prize-winning SpaceShipOne concept – a rocket plane that was lifted initially by a carrier aircraft before independent launch. SS1 became the world's first private spaceship with a series of high-altitude flights in 2004.

The programme was delayed after three Scaled Composites employees – Todd Ivens, Eric Blackwell and Charles May – were killed in an accident in Mojave on 26 July 2007, where the detonation of a tank of nitrous oxide destroyed a test stand. They had been observing the test from behind a chain-link fence that offered no protection from the shrapnel and debris when the tank exploded. Three other employees were injured in the blast and the company was fined for breaches of health and safety rules. The cause of the accident has never been made public.

The successor to SS1, SS2 was twice as large, measuring 18 m (60 ft) in length; whereas SpaceShipOne could carry a single pilot and two passengers, SS2 was planned to have a crew of two and room for six passengers. By August 2013, 640 customers had signed up for a flight, initially at a ticket price of $200,000 per person, but raised to $250,000 in May 2013. Tickets were available from more than 140 "space agents" worldwide.

===== SpaceShipTwo's projected performance =====
SpaceShipTwo was designed to fly to a height of 110 km, going beyond the defined boundary of space (100 km) and lengthening the experience of weightlessness for its passengers. The spacecraft would reach a top speed of 4000 km/h (2485 mph). On 23 May 2014, Virgin Galactic announced that they had abandoned use of the Sierra Nevada Corporation (SNC) nitrous-oxide-rubber motor for SpaceShipTwo; on 24 July 2014, SNC confirmed that they had also abandoned use of this motor for their Dream Chaser space shuttle. Future testing was to see SpaceShipTwo powered by a polyamide grain powered motor. As of July 2021 the maximum height reached has been 89.9 km.

In honor of the science-fiction series Star Trek, the first ship was named after the fictional starship Enterprise. To reenter the atmosphere, SpaceShipTwo folded its wings and then returned them to their original position for an unpowered descent flight back onto the runway. The craft had a very limited cross-range capability, and until other planned spaceports would be built worldwide, it had to land in the area where it started. Further spaceports were planned in Abu Dhabi and elsewhere, with the intention that the spaceline would have a worldwide availability and commodity in the future.

There was a series of delays to the SS2 flight test vehicle becoming operational, amidst repeated assurances from Virgin Galactic marketing that operational flights were only a year or two out. The Wall Street Journal reported in November 2014 that there has been "tension between Mr. Branson's upbeat projections and the persistent hurdles that challenged the company's hundreds of technical experts." The company responded that "the company and its contractors 'have internal milestones, such as schedule estimates and goals, but the companies are driven by safety and the completion of the flight test program before moving into commercial service.' Virgin Galactic's schedules have always been consistent with internal schedules of its contractors and changes have 'never impacted flight safety'."

==== SpaceShip III ====
SpaceShip III was an evolved version of SpaceShipTwo. All SpaceShip III development was cancelled in 2024 with no SpaceShip III spaceplanes completed or flown.

==== Delta-class spaceship ====
Virgin Galactic plans to have its third generation spaceship, the Delta class, ready for testing in late 2026 and commercial flight in mid-2027, along with the next generation of mothership. The Delta class is to be functionally the same as the SpaceShip III class, but it has been redesigned for higher production volumes. The first spaceplane, Apeiron, was revealed 28 October 2026 and flown to Spaceport America where the vehicle will undergo final preparations before beginning flight tests.

=== Fleet ===
SpaceShipTwo (spaceships)
Name	Commissioned	Decommissioned	Status
VSS Enterprise	2010	2014	Destroyed due to in flight anomaly
VSS Unity	2016	2024	Retired
SpaceShip III (spaceships)
VSS Imagine	Cancelled; never flown		
VSS Inspire	Cancelled; never flown		
Delta-class (spaceships)
Name	Commissioned	Decommissioned	Status
Spaceship Apeiron	—	—	Pending flight testing
Delta 2	—	—	Under construction
WhiteKnightTwo (motherships)
Name	Commissioned	Decommissioned	Status
VMS Eve	2008	In use	In use
Boeing 747 (motherships)
Name	Commissioned	Decommissioned	Status
Cosmic Girl	2015	2017	Transferred from Virgin Galactic to Virgin Orbit in 2017

=== Commercial spaceflight locations ===
In 2008 it was announced that test launches for its fleet of two White Knight Two mother ships and five or more SpaceShipTwo tourist suborbital spacecraft would take place from the Mojave Spaceport, where Scaled Composites was constructing the spacecraft. An international architectural competition for the design of Virgin Galactic's operating base, Spaceport America in New Mexico, saw the contract awarded to URS and Foster + Partners architects. In the same year Virgin Galactic announced that it would eventually operate in Europe out of Spaceport Sweden or even from RAF Lossiemouth in Scotland.

While the original plan called for flight operations to transfer from the California desert to the new spaceport upon completion of the spaceport, at the time Virgin Galactic had yet to complete the development and test program of SpaceShipTwo. In October 2010, the 3,000 m (10,000 ft) runway at Spaceport America was opened, with SpaceShipTwo "VSS Enterprise" shipped to the site carried underneath the fuselage of Virgin Galactic's mothership Eve.

== Other operations and aspirations ==
=== LauncherOne ===
LauncherOne was an orbital launch vehicle that Virgin Galactic started working on in 2008, with the technical specifications defined in some detail in late 2009. The LauncherOne configuration was proposed to be an expendable, two-stage, liquid-fueled rocket, envisaged to be air-launched from a White Knight Two. This would make it a similar configuration to that used by Orbital Sciences' Pegasus, or a smaller version of the StratoLaunch.

LauncherOne was publicly announced in July 2012. It was intended to launch "smallsat" payloads of 200 kilograms (440 lb) into Earth orbit. Several commercial customers initially contracted for launches, including GeoOptics, Skybox Imaging, Spaceflight Services, and Planetary Resources. Both Surrey Satellite Technology and Sierra Nevada Space Systems began developing satellite buses "optimized to the design of LauncherOne".

In 2015, Virgin Galactic established a 150,000-square-foot (14,000 m^{2}) research, development, and manufacturing center for LauncherOne at the Long Beach Airport. The company reported in March 2015 that they were on schedule to begin test flights of LauncherOne with its Newton 3 engine by the end of 2016. On 25 June 2015, the company signed a contract with OneWeb Ltd. for 39 satellite launches for its satellite constellation with an option for an additional 100 launches.

In March 2017, Virgin Galactic spun off its 200-member LauncherOne team into a new company called Virgin Orbit. Virgin Orbit went bankrupt in 2023 after a few space launches.

=== Point to point suborbital travel ===
In 2016 TSC, Virgin Galactic and the Virgin Group began a collaboration with Boom Technology to develop a supersonic trans-oceanic passenger jetliner. A mission concept review of a Mach 3 vehicle design was carried out.

== Notable accomplishments ==
=== First launch of founder into space (Note: The claim of being the first spaceflight company to independently launch a civilian into space on a suborbital flight using the 50-mile (80 km) high definition of space can be disputed as this had been done already in 2004 (see SpaceShipOne, which actually reached the 100 km (62 mi) Kármán line level). If it is meant that Virgin Galactic was the first to launch a civilian non-pilot into space on a suborbital flight, this was done already in 2019 with Beth Moses. Furthermore, because of Mr. Branson's affiliation with Virgin Galactic, it is impossible to distinguish whether his flight was done as a private person for amusement, also as a space tourist, or as a company employee on company time and company pay (also whether Branson was advertising/marketing the company, and thus was working during the flight in the capacity of company officer for the company, and was not a space tourist at all); this latter case (working during the flight) would have been a similar situation as Beth Moses or the pilots that flew Virgin Galactic's prior spaceflights were in their respective spaceflights. So it is not clear whether Mr. Branson's flight can be considered the first space tourist flight into suborbital space either; and if it cannot, then the flight is not a "first" as many people, including the above-mentioned Beth Moses, have made a spaceflight because of their work without being an astronaut, some even an orbital flight, and as Ms. Moses was in a similar situation as Mr. Branson (working for Virgin Galactic, flying suborbitally in the passenger cabin, i.e. not as a pilot) it is very hard to see in which way the 11 July 2021 flight, and especially Mr. Branson's role in it, constituted a "first of something in space" (as most of the "firsts of something in space" would have been accomplished prior to the 2021 Branson flight, for example by the 2019 Moses flight). However, as an exception to the previous statement that the 11 July 2021 flight and Mr. Branson's participation in it did not achieve any "firsts in space", let it be said that it is true that the 11 July 2021 flight was the first time more than 3 people flew suborbitally on a (USAF/NASA) spaceflight and the first time more than 1 passenger (i.e. non-pilot) flew on a suborbital (USAF/NASA) spaceflight, and Mr. Branson was the first founder of a spaceflight company to fly to (USAF/NASA) space on his own company's craft, all the above using the USAF/NASA definition of space as above 50 miles. Furthermore, all of the above concerns only suborbital spaceflights (above 50 miles) as there have been numerous orbital space flights of various space tourists (civilian, non-pilot, flying for amusement or for work, etc.) over the years and decades, e.g. Dennis Tito in 2001.) ===
On 11 July 2021 Virgin Galactic became the first spaceflight company to independently launch a founder of the company into space, using the 50-mile (80 km) high US definition of space, having flown founder Richard Branson above the 50-mile (80 km) mark on flight Unity 22. This suborbital flight was accomplished using the twin-fuselage aircraft launch platform VMS Eve, coupled together with VSS Unity, enabling Branson, three other employee passengers and the two pilots to experience approximately three minutes of weightlessness above Earth's atmosphere. The entire flight lasted approximately one hour, taking off and landing at Spaceport America facility near Truth or Consequences, New Mexico.

This flight had originally been scheduled to occur later in the summer; however, shortly after the announcement of competitor Blue Origin's plans to fly Amazon founder Jeff Bezos into space on 20 July 2021, the Virgin Galactic flight was rescheduled to occur on 11 July 2021. At the time Virgin Galactic had been certified by the FAA to provide commercial spaceflight travel, and its accounts reported that over 600 commercial passengers had already signed up. The August 2021 price was US$450,000 per person.

=== First commercial flight ===
Virgin Galactic (at some point) planned to begin commercial spaceflight service in 2022; and said it was in the final phases of returning its suborbital spaceplane to commercial service in Feb 2022. The first commercial flight took place on 29 June 2023 with three outside passengers (people not employed by Virgin Galactic whose flight was paid for from outside Virgin Galactic). The 70-minute mission was purchased for the Italian Air Force and the Italian National Research Council. The company at the time had a backlog of 800 or so individuals who had bought tickets to ride on Unity. The approximate launch cadence at the time was about one launch a month.

== Pause of commercial flights ==
Virgin Galactic ceased flights of its VSS Unity spaceplane in mid-2024 to focus on developing its next-generation Delta-class spacecraft. This strategic shift aims to enhance flight frequency and operational efficiency, with the Delta-class vehicles expected to commence commercial service by 2026.

== See also ==
- Virgin Orbit
- Dennis Tito
- List of crewed spacecraft
- New Mexico Spaceport Authority
- NewSpace
- X Prize Foundation
- Billionaire space race
