= The Spaceship Company =

Spacecraft manufacturing company

Coordinates: 35.0555664°N 118.155105°W

Virgin Galactic Holdings, LLC
- Company type: Private
- Industry: Aerospace
- Founded: Mojave, California (2005)
- Founders: Burt Rutan and Richard Branson
- Headquarters: Mojave, California
- Key people: George Whitesides (CEO); Enrico Palermo (President); Jon Campagna (CFO)
- Products: Spacecraft and aircraft production
- Number of employees: 430 (July 2018)
- Parent: Virgin Galactic
- Website: www.virgingalactic.com/

The Spaceship Company (TSC) is a British/American spacecraft manufacturing company that was founded by Burt Rutan and Richard Branson in mid-2005 and was jointly owned by Virgin Group (70%) and Scaled Composites (30%) until 2012 when Virgin Galactic became the sole owner. TSC was formed to own the technology created by Scaled for Virgin Galactic's Virgin SpaceShip program. This includes developments on the care-free reentry system and cantilevered-hybrid rocket motor, licensed from Paul Allen and Burt Rutan's Mojave Aerospace. The company is manufacturing Virgin Galactic's spacecraft and has plans to sell spacecraft to other buyers.

The suborbital launch system offered included the SpaceShipTwo (SS2) spacecraft and the White Knight Two (WK2) carrier aircraft.

== History ==
=== 2005-2010 ===
The company was founded in 2005 by Burt Rutan and Richard Branson, and was initially jointly owned by Virgin Group and Scaled Composites, to own the technology created by Scaled for Virgin Galactic's Virgin SpaceShip program. Virgin Galactic was announced to be the launch customer for the SpaceShipTwo and WhiteKnightTwo vehicles. Virgin placed an initial order for five SpaceShipTwos and two WhiteKnightTwos, with "exclusive use of the systems for the initial 18 months of commercial passenger operations."

By late 2010, the company had announced plans to build three WhiteKnightTwo aircraft and five SpaceShipTwo rocket planes.

=== 2011-present ===
Since the first WK2 and the first SS2 were built by Scaled Composites, TSC had responsibility for the manufacture of the second WK2 aircraft (not built as of 2024) and the second SS2 spacecraft for Virgin Galactic, as well as additional production craft as other customers for the vehicles would emerge.

Virgin Galactic acquired 100% ownership of TSC in 2012, by acquiring the 30% stake still owned by Scaled Composites, which itself had been acquired by Northrop Grumman.

The company had grown to 70 persons by July 2011, 145 by June 2013, 250 by July 2014, and 430 by July 2018.

In June 2013, Doug Shane joined TSC to become executive VP and general manager, ending a 31-year career with Scaled Composites, including five as president. In July 2014, Shane was named president of the company.

In 2016, it was announced that TSC, Virgin Galactic, and the Virgin Group, would be collaborating with Boom Technology to develop a supersonic trans-oceanic passenger jetliner.

By February 2018, The Spaceship Company was "duplicating and testing prototypes of an original design of SpaceShipTwo" with the goal of sending a model into space in 2019. It was building models for Virgin Galactic.

== Spaceship construction ==
In March 2010, following the construction of the prototypes of WhiteKnightTwo and SpaceShipTwo by Scaled Composites, The Spaceship Company stated in 2010 that it was moving the aircraft and spacecraft into commercial production.

By July 2014, TSC was halfway complete with the build of the second SpaceShipTwo—VSS Unity—and was 65 percent complete as of early November 2014. Virgin Galactic rolled out VSS Unity on 19 February 2016. A release by TSC on the company's Twitter account in May 2018 showed two more spacecraft, after VSS Unity, under construction.

== Aircraft construction ==
TSC collaborated with Boom Technology to create a new supersonic transport. The initial 1/3-size prototype would be the XB-1 "Baby Boom" Supersonic Demonstrator.

== Production facility ==
In November 2010, TSC broke ground on a 68,000-square-foot (6,300 m^{2}) aircraft assembly plant at Mojave Air and Space Port in Mojave, California. The manufacturing facility was expected to employ "up to 170 people when production is in full swing."

In July 2011, TSC announced it would begin production of "the first sections for a second WhiteKnightTwo (WK2) carrier aircraft along with the first of multiple SpaceShipTwo (SS2) suborbital vehicles for Virgin Galactic and, ultimately, other customers" in the "Final Assembly, Integration and Test Hangar" (FAITH) in the fall of 2011.

In September, 2011, TSC completed construction of the new plant, on schedule, for US$8,000,000. The production of new spacecraft—initially three WhiteKnightTwo aircraft and five of the smaller SpaceShipTwo rocket planes—was planned to commence before the end of that month.

The FAITH hangar was intended to be used for building the one-piece composite spars and wing for WK2, fuselage lay-up for both WK2 and SS2, and "will also be used for major maintenance and will serve as the company’s operating headquarters."
