= Adam Aircraft Industries =

American aircraft manufacturer

- Type: Private
- Industry: Aerospace
- Founded: 1998
- Defunct: 2009
- Fate: Shut down by owner
- Headquarters: Arapahoe County, Colorado
- Key people: George F. Adam, Jr. and John C. Knudsen (Founders)
- Products: Aircraft; Adam A500; Adam A700
- Number of employees: 30 (2008)
- Website: www.adamaircraft.com (archived)

Adam Aircraft Industries (AAI) was an aircraft manufacturer founded by George F. Adam Jr and John C. Knudsen in 1998. The company was located at Centennial Airport in the Denver-Aurora Metropolitan Area of Colorado, United States.

The company certified and produced the inline piston twin-engined Adam A500, while the turbofan-powered Adam A700 AdamJet was under development. The A700 was intended to be an entrant into the niche of Very Light Jets (VLJs), but its development was ceased before production was achieved.

One of the first Adam A500s manufactured, A500 s/n 0002, was featured in the 2006 Michael Mann film Miami Vice.

In conjunction with partners, the company had won a major contract from Defense Advanced Research Projects Agency (DARPA) for the development of a next-generation rotorcraft, indicating possible longer-term product development potential. However, the firm ceased operations on 11 February 2008, and filed for Chapter 7 bankruptcy on 15 February 2008.

In April 2008, the assets of the former company were purchased from bankruptcy by AAI Acquisition Inc. AAI failed to restart Adam Aircraft and in April 2009 Adam Aircraft finally ceased operations and laid off all its staff.

In April 2011 Triton Aerospace announced that they had acquired the company's assets.

== History ==
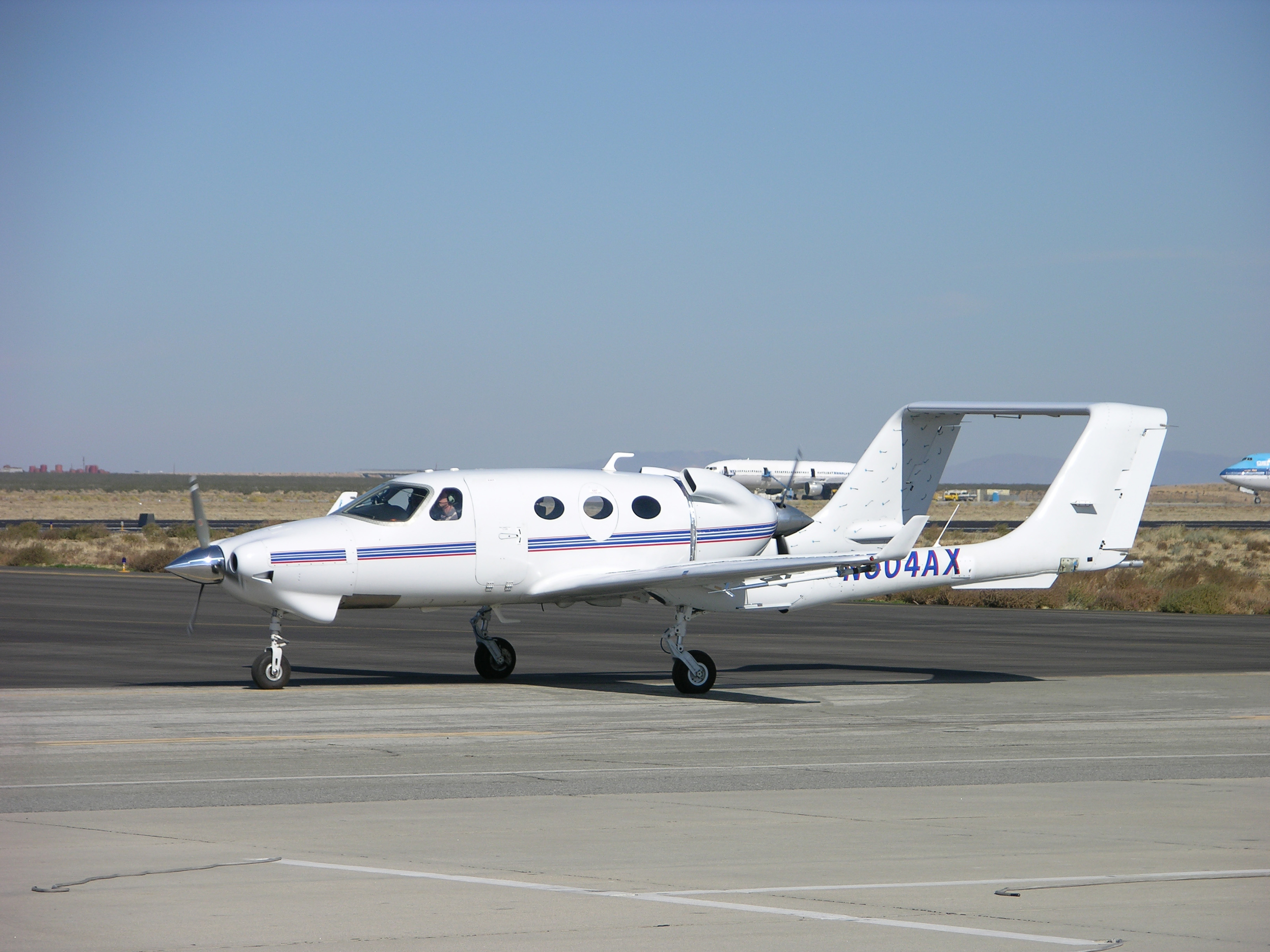
Adam A500 prototype during its flight test program at the Mojave Spaceport

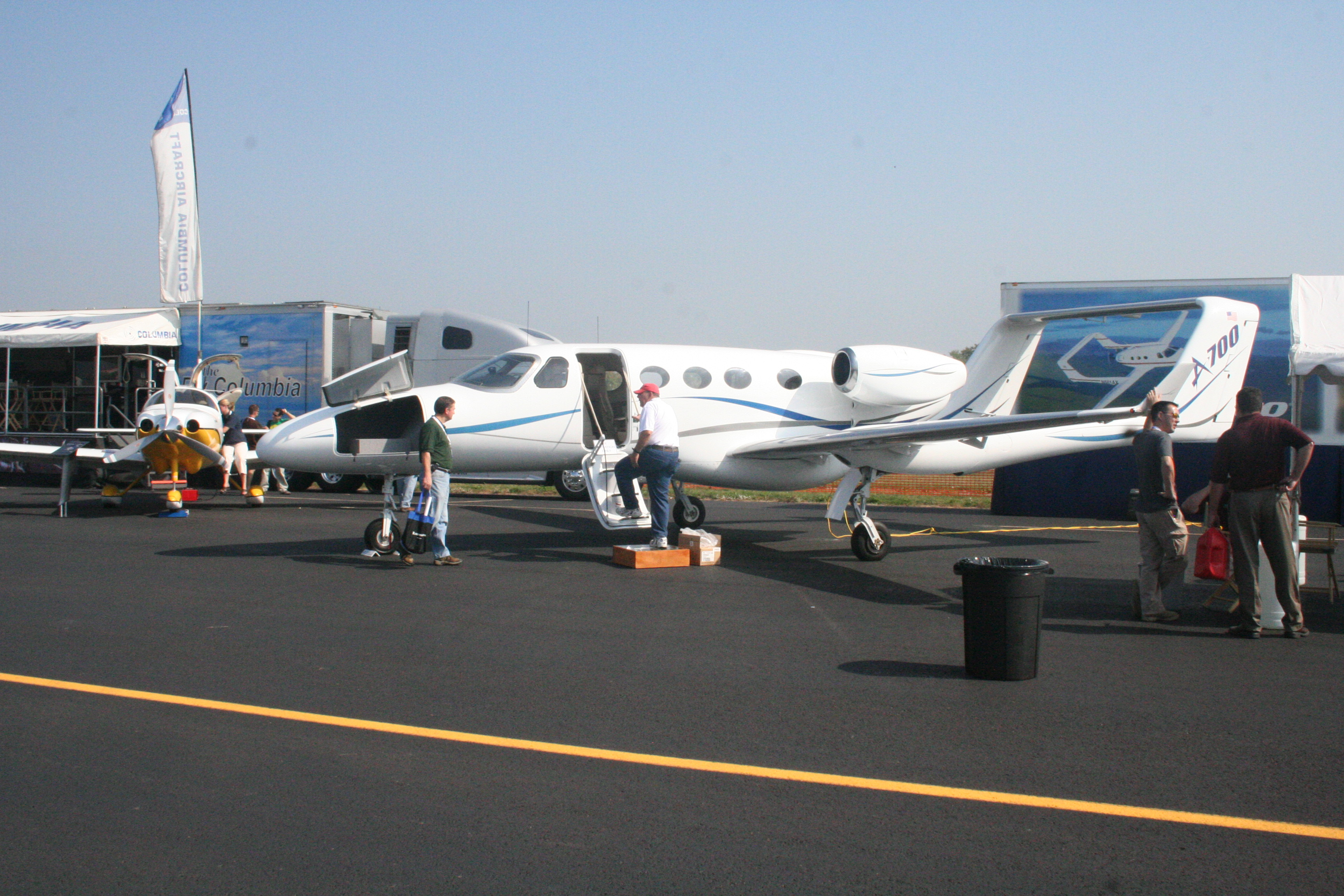
Adam A700 prototype

=== Financial problems and cessation of operations ===
In January 2008 it was announced that Adam Aircraft was having problems raising the capital required to complete certification flight testing of the A700 jet and to enter full production of the A500 piston aircraft. As a result, the company closed its Ogden, Utah plant and laid off 300 workers.

Adam Aircraft President Duncan Koerbel was quoted as saying:

"To provide for our future growth, we must be strategic in our focus by managing current cash expenditures to ensure adequate time to secure financing for the long term. We're off to a good start in this effort with assistance from our partner, Citibank, but we need to be able to provide them with sufficient time working with potential investors to secure long term financing."

The company indicated that it needed to raise between US$75 and $150 million to produce the A500 and complete certification of the A700.

In a 22 January 2008 letter to shareholders, company CEO John Wolf indicated that the company would face "liquidation" if it could not raise an additional US$25M in the seven days that remained before the end of that month, because the company had loans due and could not pay them without the additional funds.

On 11 February 2008 the company ceased operations, issuing a short news release that it was "due to the inability of the company to come to terms with their lender for funding necessary to maintain business operations."

On 14 February 2008 it was reported that employees of the company were optimistic that operations would be able to continue under new financing. At the same time aviation anonymous industry leaders interviewed by the aviation press expressed opinions that the company would not be saved and that there would be no choice but to have it liquidated. This prediction turned out correct, as the company filed for liquidation under Chapter 7 on 15 February 2008

The government of the City of Pueblo, Colorado demanded that US$2M in financial incentives paid to firm be returned. As part of its agreement with the city, Adam Aircraft had agreed to create 448 jobs, but had only created 90 jobs, almost all eliminated in the round of lay-offs in January, preceding closure. The city filed liens against Adam Aircraft's physical equipment to recover the money owed.

=== AAI Acquisition ===
On April 11, 2008, the United States Bankruptcy Court for the District of Colorado approved the sale of the company for $10 million to AAI Acquisition Inc an entity jointly controlled by Russian firms Industrial Investors and Kaskol. Industrial Investors is a private equity management company with $3 billion in assets, notably Far East Shipping Company. According to their statement, former Colorado Governor Bill Owens is a director of one of its companies. At the time of purchase, AAI VP Dmitry Shokhin said: "We plan to revive Adam Aircraft's operations, including continuing the process of certification for the A700 jet".

Industrial Investments had reportedly ordered 75 A700s prior to Adam Aircraft's bankruptcy, and restarted work on the A700 with 60 employees back at work by May 2008.

According to a July 2008 statement by Sergey Generalov, CEO and owner of Industrial Investors, more than ten other companies had bid for the assets of bankrupt AAI. prior to the tender the company made a deal with 50 Adams engineers, persuading them to stay with AAI, thus securing the winning bid. In addition to the US$10 million purchase price, Generalov expected to invest another US$150 million before the project would generate any return.

The new company confirmed at AirVenture 2008 that they would proceed with certification of the A700 and had indicated an initial forecast completion date in the first quarter of 2010. The company also confirmed that they would not produce the A500 for the foreseeable future, due to the global drop in demand for piston-engined aircraft

Citing the economic crisis of 2008 AAI Acquisition President and CEO Jack Braly announced on 28 October 2008 that A700 "Flight test and other development activity have been suspended". Braly indicated that the company's investment team and board of directors were reviewing the economic and market conditions and would decide on a new schedule for certifying the A700.

The company laid off 200 employees in October 2008, leaving 30 engineering staff at work.

In January 2009 the company announced it was seeking a new strategic partner to help it expand into new areas of business: sub-contract engineering and manufacturing for the aerospace and custom automotive industry, projects that could make use of the company's expertise in composite design and manufacturing. The company said that it had not abandoned the A700 jet project. Company Vice President of Business Development Steve Patrick said: "Based on our initial efforts, we are building a viable business base for our engineering solutions and services while retaining the option to re-launch the A700 business jet."

In April 2009, unable to find non-aerospace work for its facilities, new partners and out of operating capital, AAI Acquisition closed Adam Aircraft and laid off the last of its staff.

=== Triton America ===
In July 2009, real estate developer Thomas Hsueh purchased the remaining tooling, parts, and intellectual property of Adam Aircraft from the Russian investors. Doing business as Triton America LLC, in Anacortes, Washington, his company planned to redesign the A500 and A700, and return the aircraft to production at the Port of Skagit County, Skagit County, Washington.

In April 2011 Triton Aerospace of Skagit Regional Airport in Burlington, Washington announced that they had acquired the assets of Adam Aircraft. The company announced that it intended to return the A500 to production after re-engineering it to lose 1,000 lb (454 kg) of empty weight and recertifying it. The aircraft will also be changed to a turboprop, with twin-engined and rear-engined-only versions. Two new prototypes were expected in 2013 with re-certification to follow. The company owner, Thomas Hsueh, indicated that for now production is planned for the US, but costs may require moving the assembly line to China, or even a lower cost country, such as Mexico. Triton indicated that they have no plans to produce the A700 jet.

== List of aircraft ==
- Adam M-309 CarbonAero – (2000) Twin-piston engine centerline thrust technology demonstrator aircraft built for Adam Aircraft by Scaled Composites
- Adam A500 – (2002) Twin-piston engine centerline thrust six-person aircraft. Development of M-309
- Adam A700 AdamJet – (2003) Twin-turbofan engine six-person (+1 in optional belted lav) aircraft, with configuration similar to A500
