= Adam A500 =

American twin-engined light aircraft

A500
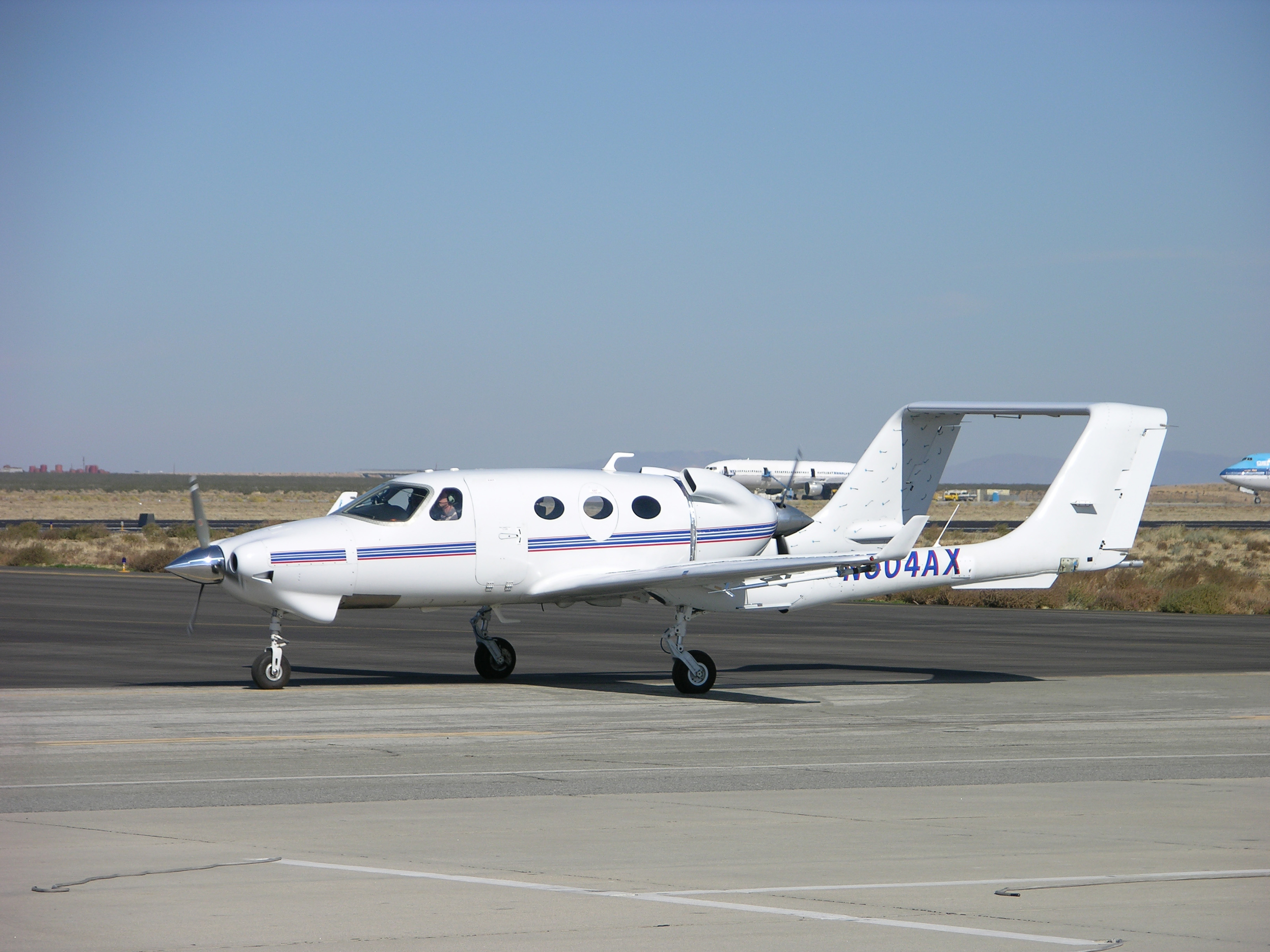
- Adam A500 during flight test at the Mojave Spaceport

General information
- Type: Civil utility aircraft
- National origin: United States
- Manufacturer: Adam Aircraft Industries
- Status: Production completed
- Number built: 7

History
- First flight: July 11, 2002
- Developed into: Adam A700

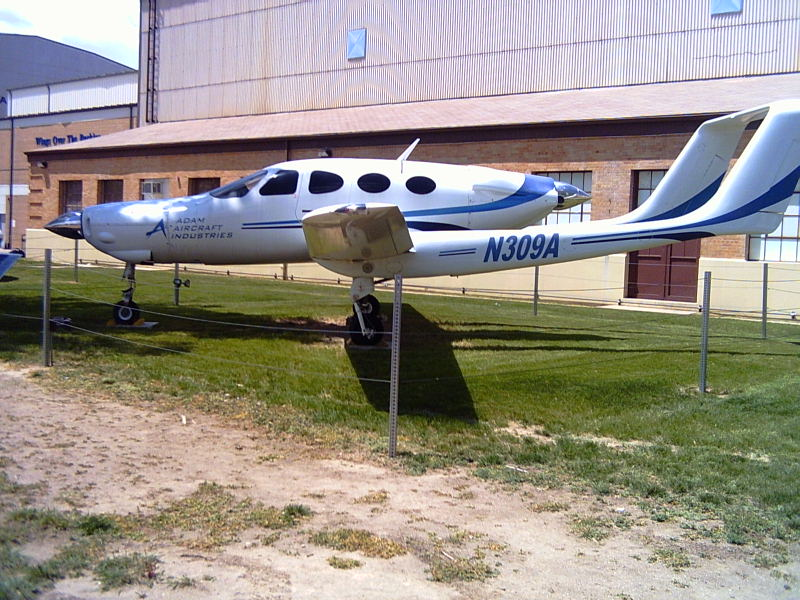
The M-309 CarbonAero technology demonstrator on display at Wings Over the Rockies Museum in May 2007.

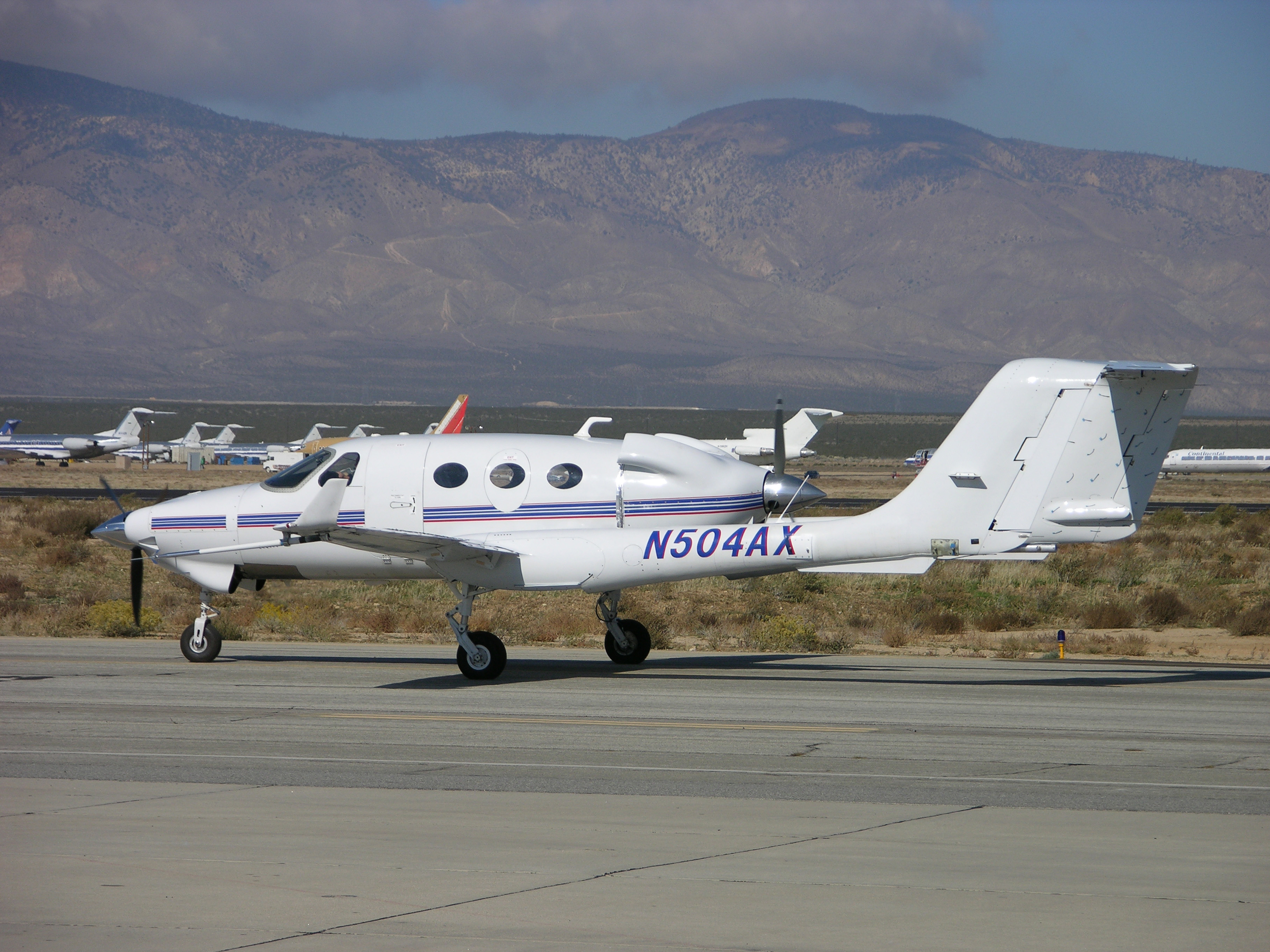
Adam A500 during flight test at the Mojave Spaceport

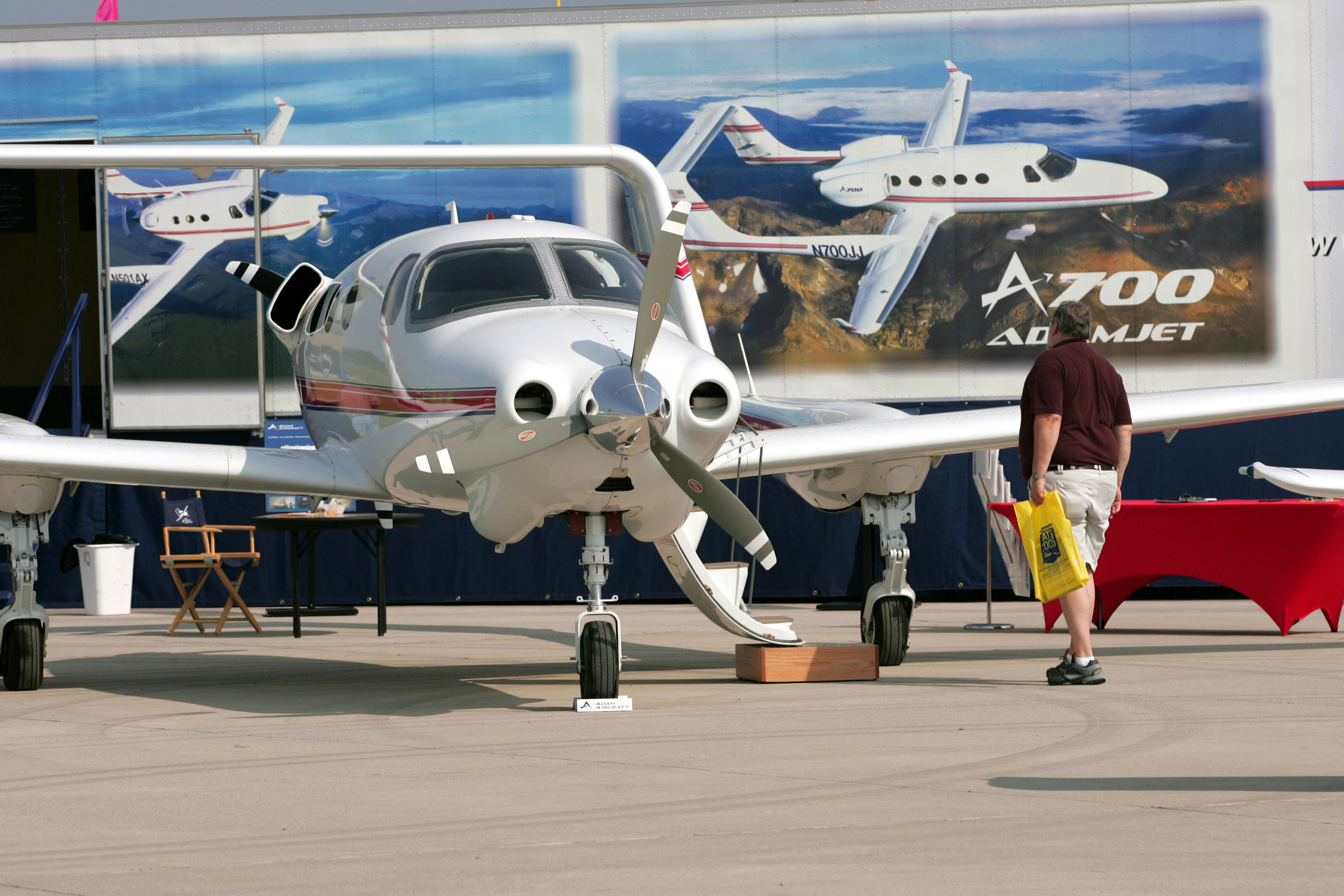
Adam A500

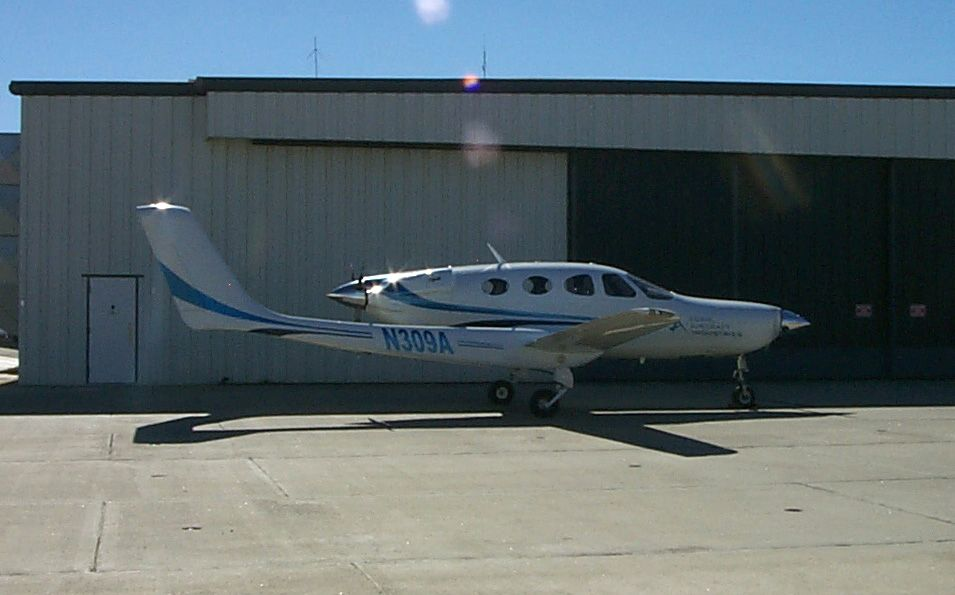
The M-309 CarbonAero technology demonstrator at Mojave

The Adam A500 is an American six-seat civil utility aircraft that was produced by Adam Aircraft Industries. The aircraft is of pod-and-boom, push-pull configuration with its two Continental TSIO-550-E piston engines mounted to provide centerline thrust.

== Design and development ==
The A500 was developed from the M-309 CarbonAero technology demonstrator designed by Burt Rutan and built by Scaled Composites at the Mojave Airport. The "309" designation refers to this being Rutan's 309th aircraft design. The 309 first flew in March 2000, but the aircraft has since been gutted and was used as a static display outside the Adam Aircraft Industries headquarters. In 2006 the 309 was loaned to the Wings Over the Rockies Air and Space Museum and is now on display.

Compared to conventional twin-engine installations, the centerline thrust arrangement reduces drag and maximizes the controllability of the aircraft should one engine malfunction or fail. This engine configuration was used by the similar Cessna Skymaster. The A500 airframe is largely built of carbon fiber epoxy composite materials with a Nomex honeycomb core. Other features include cabin pressurization.

The prototype A500 first flew on July 11, 2002, and was FAA certified in May 2005.

Adam Aircraft ceased operations on 11 February 2008, and filed for Chapter 7 bankruptcy on 19 February 2008, having delivered seven A500s.

In April 2008 Adam Aircraft was purchased from bankruptcy by AAI Acquisition Inc. At the time of purchase this new company indicated that they would pursue certification of the A700 jet as a priority and that the A500 would not be produced due to the continuing poor market for piston-engined aircraft. AAI went out of business in April 2009 without producing any aircraft.

In July 2009 there was an indication that a new buyer, Thomas Hsueh of Triton America based at Skagit Regional Airport in Burlington, Washington, was interested in purchasing the A500 design and returning the aircraft to production.

In April 2011 Triton Aerospace announced that they had acquired the assets of Adam Aircraft including the aircraft type certificate and intend to return the A500 to production.

In April 2011 Triton Aerospace announced that they will redesign the aircraft using what Thomas Hsueh, owner of Triton Aerospace, termed "proper engineering" to shed 1,000 lb (454 kg) of empty weight and recertify it with the intention of putting it back into production. The aircraft will also be changed to a turboprop, with twin engined and rear-engined-only versions. A new prototype was expected in 2013 with re-certification to follow. Hsueh indicated that for now production is planned for the US, but costs may require moving the assembly line to China or even a lower cost country such as Mexico.

By 2013 the Triton website had been taken down and the URL sold. It is likely that the company has gone out of business.

=== A500 payload issues ===
In evaluation flights conducted in 2007 the A500 was noted as being over the projected empty weight by 1,260 lb (570 kg) or 30%.

The initial design empty weight publicized in 2003 was 4,200 lb (1,910 kg), while the actual empty weight of the serial number 7 A500 was 5,460 lb (2,480 kg). Initial gross weight was to be 6,300 lb (2,860 kg), which was increased to 7,000 lb (3,180 kg). This resulted in a change of useful load from a forecast 2,100 to 1,540 lb (950 to 700 kg).

With the 230 US gal (870 L) fuel tanks full, the available payload for crew, passengers and baggage is 160 lb (73 kg), down from a projected 720 lb (327 kg). This means that the A500 cannot carry full fuel and one standard weight adult male or female pilot.

Adam Aircraft had intended to address the lack of useful load by demonstrating that the current 30 US gal (110 L) of unusable fuel is actually 10 US gal (40 L). This would have increased the useful load by 120 lb (50 kg) and allowed a full fuel crew weight of 280 lb (127 kg).

=== Support and aircraft type club formation ===
The five A500s in private service have run into problems obtaining parts and at least one was reported as grounded due to parts issues in August 2008.

The aircraft owners organized an aircraft type club, the A500 Owners Association, with the goal of convincing the new owners of the design at that time, AAI Acquisitions to provide parts support for the existing aircraft.

AAI's head of customer support, Jan D'Angelo, responded in August 2008, saying:

There's no economic model that justifies setting up a support team to support just five planes in the field. There's no critical mass to make it economically viable.

== Aircraft on display ==
- Wings Over the Rockies Air and Space Museum - M309 proof of concept design
- Pima Air and Space Museum - N504AX

== Specifications (A500) ==
Data from Adam Aircraft and The Incomplete Guide to Airfoil Usage

General characteristics

- Crew: one
- Capacity: five passengers
- Length: 37 ft 6 in (11.43 m)
- Wingspan: 44 ft 0 in (13.41 m)
- Height: 9 ft 7 in (2.92 m)
- Airfoil: NASA LS(1)-0417
- Empty weight: 5,350 lb (2,427 kg)
- Gross weight: 7,000 lb (3,175 kg)
- Fuel capacity: 230 gal (872 litres)
- Powerplant: 2 × Teledyne Continental TSIO-550E , 350 hp (260 kW) each

Performance

- Maximum speed: 225 kn (259 mph, 417 km/h)
- Cruise speed: 220 kn (250 mph, 410 km/h)
- Stall speed: 75 kn (86 mph, 139 km/h) in landing configuration with gear and flaps down
- Range: 892 nmi (1,026 mi, 1,652 km) at 75% power
- Ferry range: 1,286 nmi (1,480 mi, 2,382 km) at 45% power
- Service ceiling: 25,000 ft (7,600 m) maximum certified ceiling, 14900 feet on one engine

== See also ==
Related development

- Adam A700

Aircraft of comparable role, configuration, and era

- Cessna Skymaster
