= Northern State Hospital =

Washington State psychiatric hospital closed in 1973

- Washington State Department of Social and Health Services
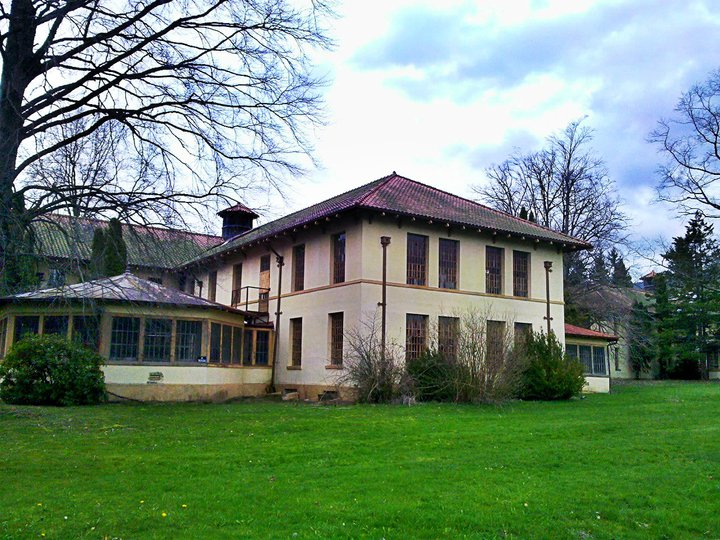
- Northern State Hospital, 2013

Geography
- Location: Sedro-Woolley, Washington, United States
- Coordinates: 48.530556°N 122.206667°W

Organization
- Type: Psychiatric

History
- Founded: 1912
- Closed: 1973

Links
- Lists: Hospitals in Washington state
- Northern State Hospital
- U.S. National Register of Historic Places
- NRHP reference No.: 10001043

Northern State Hospital is a historic hospital campus in Sedro-Woolley, Washington. It was originally opened in 1912 and closed in 1973. It is listed on the National Register of Historic Places. It is located 4 miles northeast from the central business district of the city, and sits off of Washington State Route 20. The campus was annexed into the City of Sedro-Woolley on September 10, 2015. The campus now functions as the Sedro-Woolley Innovation for Tomorrow (SWIFT) Center.

== History ==
The hospital was commissioned in 1909, in response to the overcrowding at the Western State Hospital in Steilacoom. The construction of the hospital was suggested by Dr. Arthur P. Calhoun, who was the superintendent of Western State from 1906 to 1914.

The buildings were designed by Seattle architects Saunders and Lawton, using the Spanish Colonial Revival style. The grounds were designed by the Olmsted Brothers landscape architecture firm.

The hospital was built to serve those who were found to be insane under the superior courts of Clallam, Island, Jefferson, King, Kitsap, San Juan, Skagit, and Snohomish Counties. The hospital initially started out with 100 patients that were transferred from Western State, all of those being male. These patients helped with the construction of the hospital.

In 1913, four more ward buildings were commissioned to house patients. By 1915, the hospital held around 485 patients. At this time the hospital's population remained fairly stagnant as it was treated as a branch of Western State, therefore only holding transfer patients. This was changed in the same year, with legislature approved for the hospital to receive patients from outside of Western State.

In response to this change, an expansion of the hospital was commissioned and granted to the architects Heath and Grove of Tacoma, WA. The new buildings opened on the main campus included the men and women's receiving buildings, an assembly hall, and a laundry. The expansion of the farm section of the campus included a cow barn, a horse barn, a hay barn, a milk house, and an implement house. This expansion allowed for an additional 200 patients.

By 1917, the hospital consisted of 10 buildings and the held about 750 patients. 70 staff were employed at the hospital, with 46 of those being attendants. The patient to attendant ratio was 16 to 1.

Due to the rising population, a new male ward was constructed, and another wing was added to the already existing female ward. A power house, stack boiler, and automatic stokers were also built. Improvements were also made to the heating and lighting. This expansion was proposed in 1917 but was delayed due to World War I, with the buildings being completed in 1919.

In 1921, another male ward was constructed with room for 49 patients. Two more stokers were also built the same year. In 1922, there was reportedly 1,084 patients.

The hospital was closed in 1973 under the direction of governor Dan Evans due to state budget cuts. The last patients left the hospital on August 16, 1973. The closure led to the loss of 500 jobs by hospital staff. The remaining patients were transferred to Western State Hospital, while others were released to the general public.

== Incidents and Controversies ==
On August 9, 1921, a hospital attendant named James S. Hulen was murdered by a patient named Valentine Readal with a razor.

Later in the same month, a cook named Paul Staudte was fired for refusing to serve rotten food. Staudte also accused the hospital of underfeeding patients. The hospital faced allegations of abuse of patients and overcrowding as well, leading to a state board inquiry.

The hospital was also accused of "redlighting", also known as patient dumping. In a 1920 case explored by the Seattle Star, one patient was allegedly dumped in Grand Junction, Colorado, while another was dumped in Norman, Oklahoma. The hospital was accused of keeping the state allowance for each man.

On February 9, 1922, a patient named John Shellack was murdered in his bed with a razor, presumably by another patient. His murder remains unsolved and he was laid to rest at the hospital cemetery.

On July 6, 1928, John Wilson Hesford, a patient at the epileptic ward, was allegedly beaten by attendant K. K. Kyler after an altercation. Hesford died a week later. According to other patients, Kyler had stomped on Hesford while he was lying on the ground. X-rays taken post mortem showed that Hesford had broken ribs on his left side. The testimony of the patients who witnessed the attack was discredited during the trial due to their mental conditions. Kyler was eventually acquitted by judge George Joiner and Hesford's death was blamed on his epilepsy.

In 1981, parts of a small intestine and a human head were found at a chemical dump site off of Mosquito Lake Road. These remains allegedly came from Northern State, who used the dump site for chemicals such as formaldehyde and broken laboratory apparatuses. The dump site served as the chemical waste disposal for Skagit and Whatcom counties up to 1977.

In 1983, Hawthorne Funeral Home in Mount Vernon discovered 200 food cans labeled with patient identification numbers from the hospital. The cans contained the remains of those who had died from 1941 to 1953, when the hospital crematory shut down. They had been in storage since the hospital closed in 1973. These cans were then buried at another cemetery. It is estimated that around 900 patients were cremated and buried in food cans both in the hospital cemetery and at other local cemeteries.

In 1995, it was revealed by the United States Department of Energy that from 1954 to 1958 radiation experiments were conducted on patients of the hospital in conjunction with the University of Washington. In the experiment, Iron-55 was injected into the veins of patients at 100 microcurie dosages and monitored over a period of months. The study involved 6 adult men and 18 adult women.

== Post-Closure ==
A plaque at the cemetery site down the hill from the hospital reads:

In respectful memory of the 1,487 Northern State Hospital patients interred in these grounds. May they now rest in peace with dignity. 1913 - 1972

Only a few of the patients' graves have markers, bearing just a number, and initials. Many of these graves have been sunken under the surface of the soil or been damaged by weather, making them unreadable. Graves have also been found outside the cemetery fence, with many others thought to be undiscovered north of the cemetery plot from early land records. Death records of patients who died from 1911 to 1963 only became available in 2023.

== Sedro-Woolley Innovation for Tomorrow (SWIFT) Center ==
In response to local perception that the public asset of the campus has been underutilized, the City of Sedro-Woolley, Port of Skagit, Upper Skagit Tribe, and Washington State Department of Enterprise Services initiated a collaborative stakeholder process to explore redevelopment opportunities of the campus. An adaptive reuse study was initiated in 2014, and the City of Sedro-Woolley adopted a subarea plan for the campus on December 9, 2015. The intent of the plan is to encourage private sector revitalization, continued public access to the campus, environmental protection, and acknowledgement and respect to the historical significance of the site and interests of the Upper Skagit Tribe.

Public access to portions of the site was restored in 2019. The campus currently serves several public and private entities, including the Cascade Job Corps Center and United States Department of Labor. The Campus is owned and operated by the Port of Skagit.

== Notable Patients ==
John Patric, Pacific Northwest based author

== See also ==
- National Register of Historic Places listings in Skagit County, Washington
