= Fly-in =

Pre-arranged gathering of aviators with their aircraft

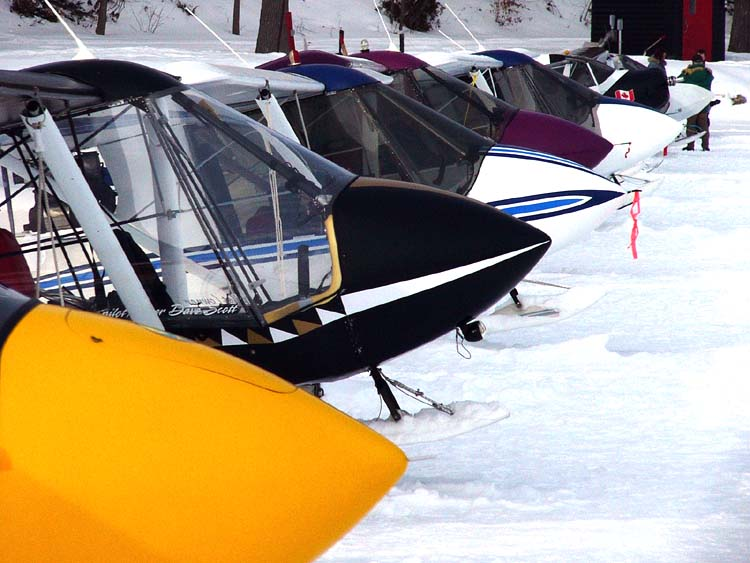
A fly-in of Quad City Challenger aircraft belonging to an aircraft type club

A fly-in, also called an aviation meet, is a pre-arranged gathering of aircraft, pilots and passengers for recreational and social purposes.

Fly-ins may be formally or informally organised, members of the public may or may not be invited, the gathering may be at an airport or in a farmer's field.

Fly-ins can be aimed at specific aircraft classes, such as taildraggers, warbirds, experimental aircraft or specific aircraft models. They may be organized by a national organization, such as the Canadian Owners and Pilots Association or the Experimental Aircraft Association, the airport owner or authority, a flying club, an aircraft type club or by a group of friends meeting perhaps for a barbecue and to socialize.

The term "fly-in" is not formally defined in the aviation legislation of many countries and it may refer to a range of events, while in others it has a specific legal meaning. For example, in Canada fly-ins may not legally include air displays or competitive flying.

== History ==
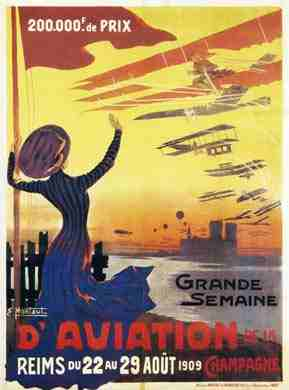
Poster for the Grande Semaine d'Aviation de la Champagne

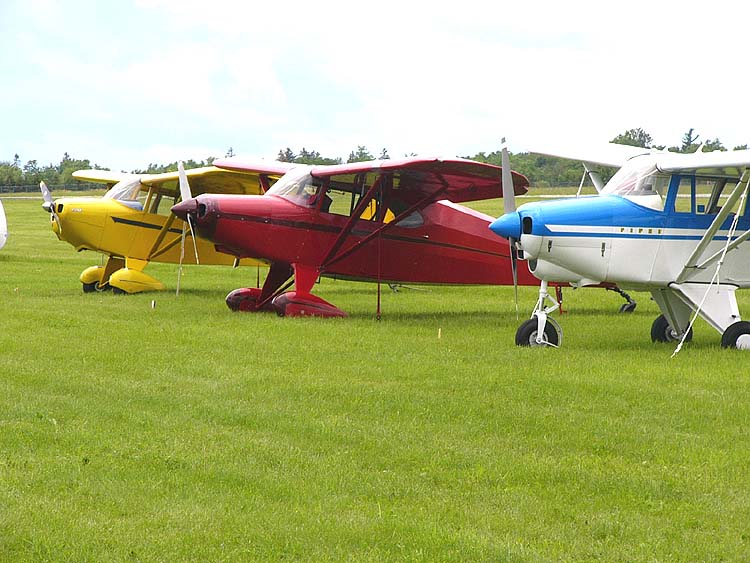
A fly-in of Short Wing Piper aircraft from an Aircraft type club. The aircraft are (l-r) a Piper PA-17 Vagabond, a Piper PA-16 Clipper and a Piper PA-22-150 Tri-Pacer

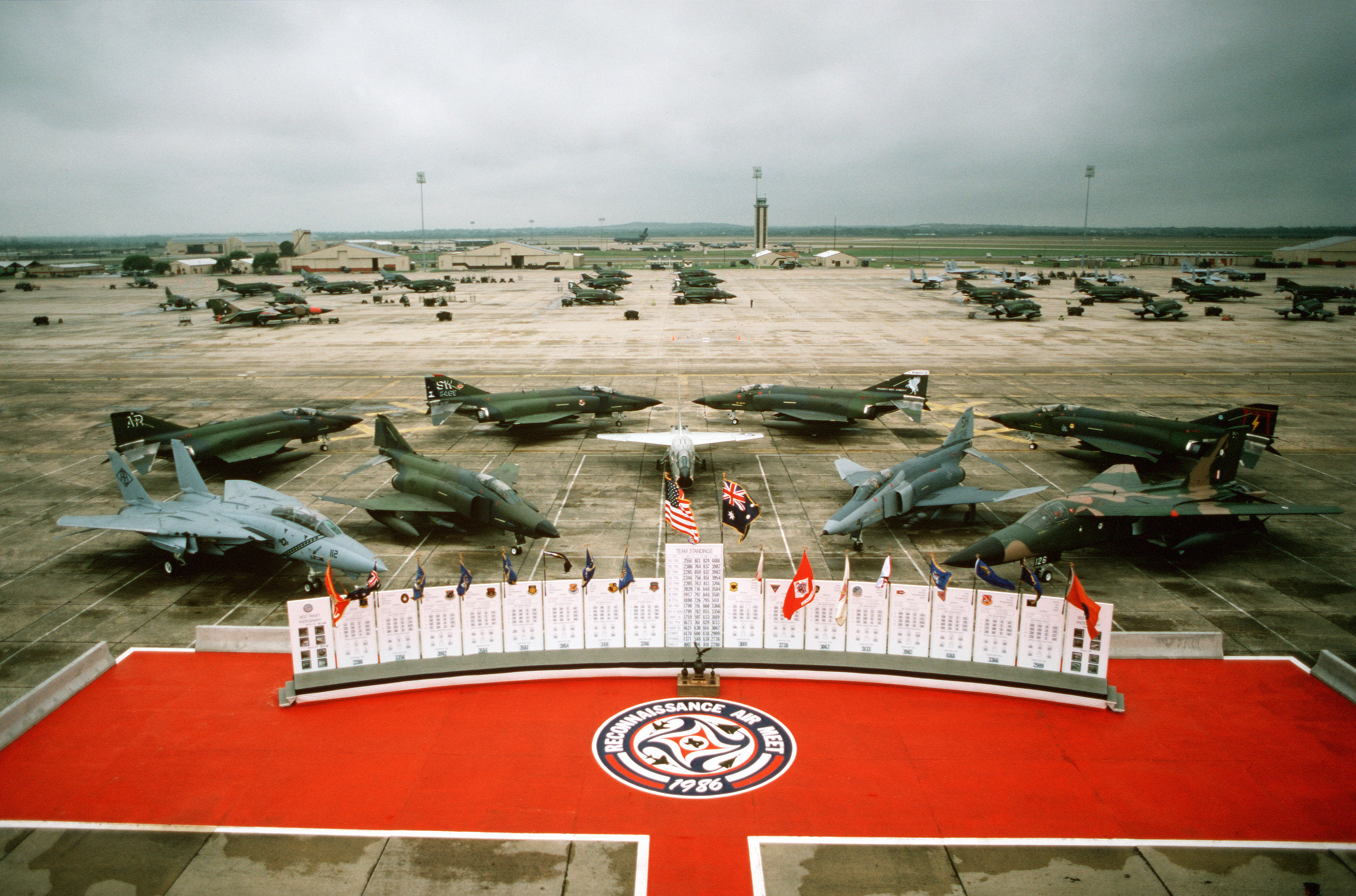
Reconnaissance air meet at Bergstrom AFB

Both fly-ins and airshows evolved out of the first aviation meets held in the pioneering days of flying, early in the twentieth century, before the First World War.

Although there were some minor aviation meets in France earlier in 1909, at Port-Aviation (often called "Juvisy Airfield") in Viry-Châtillon south of Paris, in Douai, and in Vichy, the first major international aviation meet was the Grande Semaine d'Aviation (English: Grand Week of Aviation) held in Reims, France, between 22 and 29 August 1909. The event attracted some of the world's foremost pilots of the day, including Louis Blériot, Henry Farman, Léon Delagrange, Hubert Latham, Charles de Lambert, Louis Paulhan, Roger Sommer, Claude Grahame-White and one American, Glenn Curtiss. The event was primarily a competition for record setting. Curtis set a speed record of 80 km/h (43 kn) flying a biplane he had designed, winning the first race for Gordon Bennett Coupe Internationale d'Aviation. Henry Farman set a distance record of 180 km (97 nmi) in just over three hours. Hubert Latham won the altitude contest by attaining 155 m (509 ft). The event attracted large crowds of spectators including 3,000 from the United Kingdom and 2,000 from the United States. None of the aircraft were flown-in, but arrived via ground transport and assembled in place.

The first person to actually fly into an aviation meeting was Hubert Latham, who flew to the 1909 Konkurrenz-Fliegen Berlin at Johannisthal Air Field from the Tempelhof field on 27 September 1909, a distance of 10.5 km (6.5 mi). This was one of the several meetings inspired by the Reims meeting. Latham's flight was the first cross-country flight in Germany.

Flying to aviation meetings was sometimes discouraged. For example, Robert Martinet wanted to fly his plane to the June 1910 Angers aviation meeting, but was refused by the organizers, on the grounds that this potentially dangerous flight would put his appearance at the meeting at risk. The expression in English most commonly used for similar events in the pre-World War I era was "aviation meeting" (in Europe) or "aviation meet" (in the USA).

The first aviation meet located in the United Kingdom was held at Doncaster between 15 and 23 October 1909. It preceded the second UK event held at Blackpool by only three days. Both events competed for the honour of being the first of their type in the country and as a result neither drew the expected public interest. The Doncaster event attracted a dozen aircraft and pilots, but bad weather prevented much of the planned flying and many of the trophies were not awarded. The event lost a considerable amount of money.

The first major competitive aviation meet held in the United States was the Los Angeles Aviation Meet, held 10–20 January 1910 at Dominguez Field. Again this was a competition-style meet with almost all the aircraft from France. Louis Paulhan set a height record of just under one mile (1.6 km) and also took the prize for endurance with a flight of 1:49:40 that covered 61 mi (98 km).

The first African aviation meet was the Grande Semaine d'Aviation d'Egypt held at Heliopolis, east of Cairo, 6–13 February 1910. The event took advantage of the good winter weather found in that country and attracted fliers from all over Europe. The event was organized by the Aero Club of Egypt assisted by the Aero Club de France and was sponsored by Prince Pasha, uncle of the Khedive of Egypt. Pilots flew from an aerodrome that was staked out in the desert that had a landing and take-off surface that was 5 km (3 mi) by 3 km (2 mi) wide. Competitions were flown between the twelve pilots participating and 173,000 Francs in prize money was disbursed. One participant was "Baroness" Raymonde de Laroche, the first woman in the world to earn a pilot's license, who won a 10,000 Franc prize for her flight of 10 km (6.2 mi).

The People's Republic of China had been a difficult environment for general aviation, having had severe limits placed on it in the communist era, but by 2011 the government agreed to lift restrictions and to promote the use of business and personal aviation. China's first fly-in was to be held from 20th–24th September 2011 in Beijing as part of a five-day conference on general aviation, but the fly-in was "postponed indefinitely" due to a Beijing Police Department helicopter crash that raised safety concerns.

Switzerland's fly-ins include the one from La Côte, near Prangins, which was held each every 2 years since 2007, organized by the local air-club "Club Aéronautique Swissair Genève" (CASG).
