= Heritage Flight Museum =

American aviation museum

- Location within Washington (state)
- Established: 1996
- Location: Burlington, Washington
- Coordinates: 48.4642°N 122.4206°W
- Type: Aviation museum
- Founder: Major General William Anders
- Website: heritageflight.org

The Heritage Flight Museum is an aviation museum located at Skagit Regional Airport just west of Burlington, Washington.

== History ==
The museum was founded by the family of Apollo 8 astronaut William Anders in 1996 and was originally located at Bellingham International Airport. The museum moved to Skagit Regional Airport in 2013.

The museum announced plans for an expansion in 2018. Ground was broken on 22 March 2021.

== Collection ==
- Beechcraft AT-11 Kansan
- Beechcraft T-34 Mentor
- Beechcraft T-34 Mentor
- Beechcraft T-34 Mentor
- Bell H-13 Sioux
- Bell UH-1B Iroquois
- Boeing-Stearman PT-13 Kaydet
- Canadian Car & Foundry Harvard IV – converted to resemble a Mitsubishi A6M2 Zero
- Cessna O-1 Bird Dog
- Cessna O-2 Skymaster
- de Havilland Canada DHC-2 Beaver
- Douglas A-1 Skyraider
- Fairchild PT-19
- Interstate Cadet
- Mikoyan-Gurevich MiG-21PFM
- North American AT-6D Texan
- North American AT-6F Texan
- North American P-51D Mustang
- Northrop F-89J Scorpion
- Stinson L-13

== See also ==
- List of aerospace museums
