= Douglas A-1 Skyraider =

American single engine attack aircraft

A-1 (AD) Skyraider
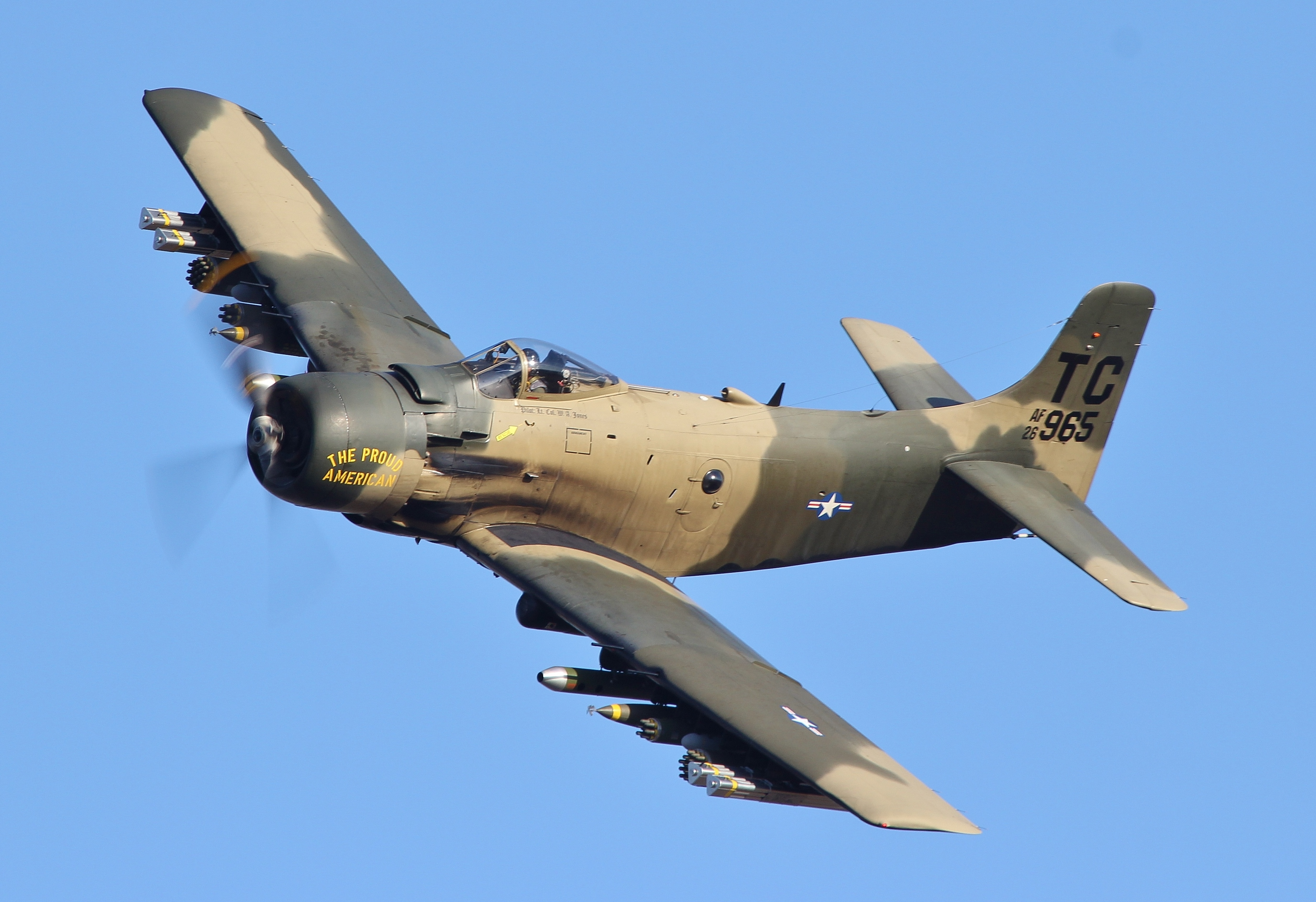
- AD-4NA Skyraider warbird of the Heritage Flight Museum

General information
- Type: Attack aircraft
- National origin: United States
- Manufacturer: Douglas Aircraft Company
- Primary users: United States Navy United States Marine Corps; United States Air Force; Royal Navy; South Vietnam Air Force; French Air Force
- Number built: 3,180

History
- Manufactured: 1945–1957
- Introduction date: 1946
- First flight: 18 March 1945
- Retired: 1973 (US use); 1985 (Gabonese Air Force)
- Developed into: Douglas A2D Skyshark

The Douglas A-1 Skyraider (formerly designated AD before the 1962 unification of Navy and Air Force designations) is a single-seat attack aircraft designed and produced by American aerospace manufacturer Douglas Aircraft Company. It had an unusually long career, remaining in frontline service well into the Jet Age (when most piston-engined attack or fighter aircraft were replaced by jet-powered aircraft), thus becoming known by some as an "anachronism". The aircraft was nicknamed "Spad", after the French World War I fighter.

Development of the Skyraider commenced during World War II as a carrier-compatible, single-seat dive/torpedo bomber that was capable of long endurance missions and possessing relatively high performance for the era. Ordered by the United States Navy (USN) in July 1944, the XBT2D-1 prototype performed its maiden flight on 18 March 1945. Various modifications were made to lighten the airframe to bolster its performance ahead of the Skyraider's entry to service in 1946. While procurement was initially slashed due to the end of World War II, numerous orders for the type were placed, resulting in production continuing through to 1957. The Skyraider was operated by various services, including the USN, the United States Marine Corps (USMC), the United States Air Force (USAF), the Royal Navy (RN), the French Air Force, and the Republic of Vietnam Air Force (RVNAF) amongst others.

Operationally, the Skyraider was principally used as a close air support aircraft; in this capacity, it was extensively used during both the Korean War and Vietnam War, as well as multiple other conflicts. In the Korean theatre, it possessed more endurance while carrying larger quantities of ordnance than any contemporary jet-powered aircraft. The Skyraider also frequently undertook interdiction missions. While not intended for the role, it was not defenseless in air-to-air engagements; on 16 June 1953, a Skyraider shot down a Soviet-built Polikarpov Po-2 biplane, this being the only documented Skyraider aerial victory of the conflict. During the Vietnam War, the type used cannon fire to shoot down two Mikoyan-Gurevich MiG-17 jet fighters of the Vietnam People's Air Force (VPAF). British Skyraiders were deployed during the Suez Crisis while France used its during the Algerian War. It remained in US service until the early 1970s, having been supplanted by newer jet-powered aircraft, such as the Grumman A-6 Intruder.

== Design and development ==
The origins of the Skyraider can be traced back to World War II and a decision made in 1943 by the United States Navy's (USN) Bureau of Aeronautics to overturn a long-standing preference for procuring multi-seat aircraft as dive bombers and torpedo bombers; furthermore, the bureau sought to combine both of these missions into a single aircraft type. A requirement was promptly formulated for a carrier-based, single-seat, long-range, high performance aircraft to perform the dive bomber/torpedo bomber mission as a successor to earlier aircraft, including the Douglas SBD Dauntless, the Curtiss SB2C Helldiver and the Grumman TBF Avenger. In response, Douglas Aircraft Company opted to produce a new design to propose; the company's design team was headed by Ed Heinemann. Upon presentation, bureau officials were impressed; accordingly, on 6 July 1944, the company received an order for prototypes under the designation of XBT2D-1.

On 18 March 1945, the first XBT2D-1 conducted its maiden flight, almost four months ahead of schedule. On 7 April 1945, the prototype was delivered to the USN'd Naval Air Test Center (NATC) where a service evaluation was performed; test pilots allegedly reported that the XBT2D-1 performed better than any dive-bomber to have previously been evaluated. Accordingly, on 5 May 1945, the service ordered the aircraft into quantity production under the designation of AD-1; the type received the Skyraider name around this time as well. Months later, the Surrender of Japan and the end of the conflict led to production being curtailed, but not cancelled. In December 1946, the delivery of the first production aircraft to a fleet squadron, VA-19A, took place.

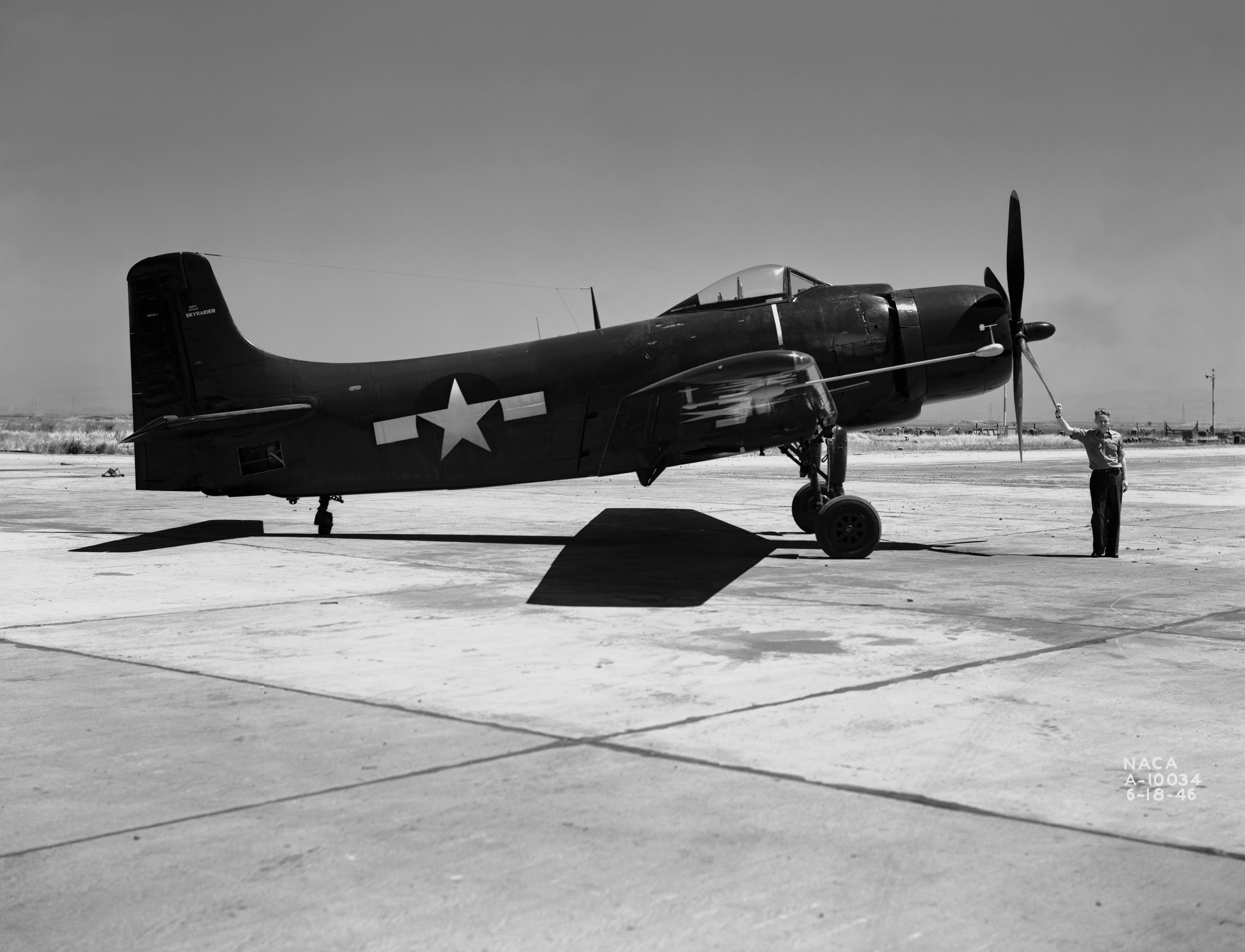
A Douglas XBT2D-1 Skyraider prototype

In terms of its basic configuration, the AD-1 is a low-wing monoplane, powered by a single Wright R-3350 Duplex-Cyclone 18-cylinder radial engine, capable of producing well over 2,000 hp (1,500 kW), which was upgraded several times, ultimately attaining 2,800 hp (2,100 kW). The aircraft had distinctive large straight wings with seven hardpoints apiece. The Skyraider had excellent maneuverability at low speed, and carried a large amount of ordnance over a considerable combat radius. It had a long loiter time for its size, compared to much heavier subsonic or supersonic jets. The aircraft was optimized for ground attack and was armored against ground fire in key locations, unlike faster fighters adapted to carry bombs, such as the Vought F4U Corsair or North American P-51 Mustang, which were retired by US forces before the 1960s.

Shortly after Heinemann began designing the XBT2D-1, a study was issued showing that for every 100 lb (45 kg) of weight reduction, the takeoff run was decreased by 8 ft (2.4 m), the combat radius increased by 22 mi (35 km) and the rate-of-climb increased by 18 ft/min (0.091 m/s). Heinemann immediately had his design engineers begin a program for finding weight savings on the XBT2D-1 design, no matter how small. Simplifying the fuel system resulted in a reduction of 270 lb (120 kg); 200 lb (91 kg) by eliminating an internal bomb bay and hanging external stores from the wings or fuselage; 70 lb (32 kg) by using a fuselage dive brake; and 100 lb (45 kg) by using an older tailwheel design. In the end, Heinemann and his design engineers achieved more than 1,800 lb (820 kg) of weight reduction on the original XBT2D-1 design. The AD-1 was built at Douglas's El Segundo plant in Southern California.

The Navy AD series was initially painted in ANA 623 glossy sea blue, but during the 1950s, following the Korean War, the color scheme was changed to light gull gray and white (Fed Std 595 27875). Initially using the gray and white Navy scheme, by 1967 the USAF began to paint its Skyraiders in a camouflaged pattern using two shades of green, and one of tan. Used by the USN over Korea and Vietnam, the A-1 was a primary close air support aircraft for both the USAF and RVNAF during the Vietnam War. The A-1 was famous for being able to take hits and keep flying thanks to armor plating around the cockpit area for pilot protection. It was gradually replaced from the mid-1960s onwards by the Grumman A-6 Intruder as the USN's primary medium-attack plane in supercarrier-based air wings; however Skyraiders continued to operate from the smaller Essex-class aircraft carriers.

The Skyraider went through seven versions, starting with the AD-1, then AD-2 and AD-3 with various minor improvements, then the AD-4 with a more powerful R-3350-26WA engine. The AD-5 was significantly widened, allowing two crew to sit side-by-side (this was not the first multiple-crew variant, the AD-1Q being a two-seater and the AD-3N a three-seater); it also came in a four-seat night-attack version, the AD-5N. The AD-6 was an improved AD-4B with improved low-level bombing equipment, and the final production version AD-7 was upgraded to an R-3350-26WB engine.

For service in Vietnam, USAF Skyraiders were fitted with the Stanley Yankee extraction system, which acted in a similar manner to an ejection seat, though with twin rockets extracting the pilot from the cockpit.

In addition to serving in Korea and Vietnam as an attack aircraft, the Skyraider was modified to serve as a carrier-based airborne early warning aircraft, replacing the Grumman TBM-3W Avenger. It fulfilled this function with both the USN and Royal Navy (RN) before being replaced by the Grumman E-1 Tracer and Fairey Gannet, respectively, in those services.

Skyraider production ended in 1957 with a total of 3,180 having been built. In 1962, the existing Skyraiders were redesignated A-1D through A-1J and later used by both the United States Air Force (USAF) and the USN in the Vietnam War.

== Operational history ==
=== Korean War ===
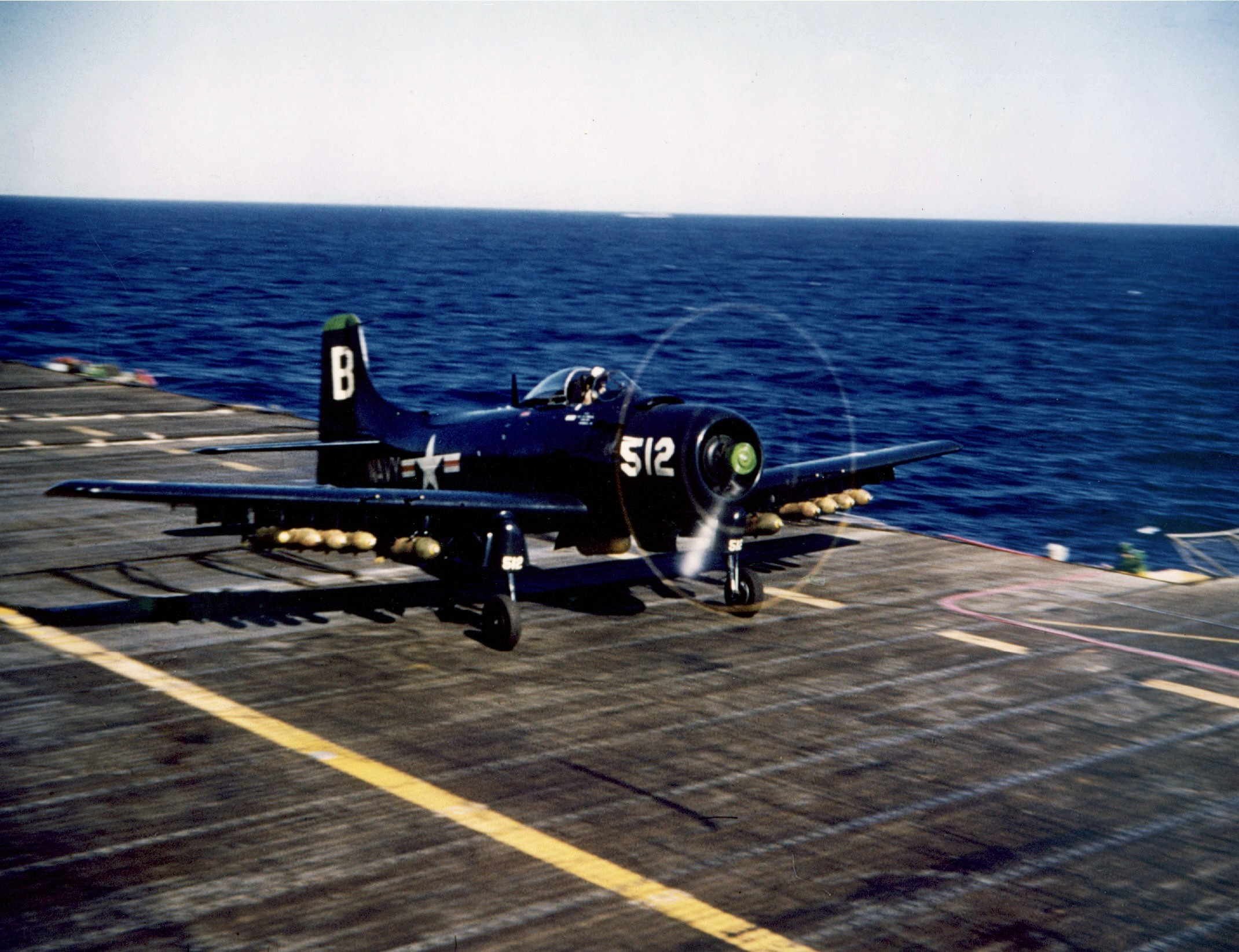
AD-4 Skyraider taking off from USS Princeton during the Korean War

The Skyraider was produced too late for use in World War II, but became the backbone of USN aircraft carrier and USMC strike aircraft sorties in the Korean War (1950–1953). The first ADs were sent into action from USS Valley Forge with VA-55 on 3 July 1950. Its weapons load and 10-hour flying time far surpassed the jets that were available at the time. The type frequently performed close air support and interdiction operations, the latter being focused on the supply lines of the North Korean Army.

On 2 May 1951, Skyraiders made the only aerial torpedo attack of the war, hitting the Hwacheon Dam, then controlled by North Korea.

On 16 June 1953, a USMC AD-4 from VMC-1 shot down a Soviet-built Polikarpov Po-2 biplane, the only documented Skyraider air victory of the war. AD-3N and -4N aircraft carrying bombs and flares, flew night-attack sorties, and radar-equipped ADs carried out radar-jamming missions from carriers and land bases.

During the Korean War, AD Skyraiders were flown by only the USN and USMC, and were normally painted in dark navy blue, leading to it being commonly called the "Blue Plane" by enemy troops. USMC Skyraiders suffered heavy losses when used in low-level close-support missions. To allow low-level operations to continue without unacceptable losses, a package of additional armor was fitted, consisting of 0.25–0.5 inches (6.4–12.7 mm) thick external aluminum armor plates fitted to the underside and sides of the aircraft's fuselage. The armor package weighed a total of 618 pounds (280 kg) and had little effect on performance or handling. A total of 128 USN and USMC Skyraiders were lost in the Korean War – 101 in combat and 27 to operational causes. Many of the operational losses were attributed to the tremendous power of the aircraft: Skyraiders that were "waved-off" during carrier recovery operations were prone to performing a fatal torque roll into the sea or the deck of the aircraft carrier if the pilot mistakenly gave the aircraft too much throttle.

=== Cathay Pacific VR-HEU incident ===
On 26 July 1954, a pair of Skyraiders from the aircraft carriers USS Philippine Sea and Hornet reportedly shot down a pair of Chinese People's Liberation Army Air Force (PLAAF) Lavochkin fighters off the coast of Hainan Island while searching for survivors after the shooting down of a Cathay Pacific Douglas DC-4 Skymaster airliner three days previously.

=== Vietnam War ===
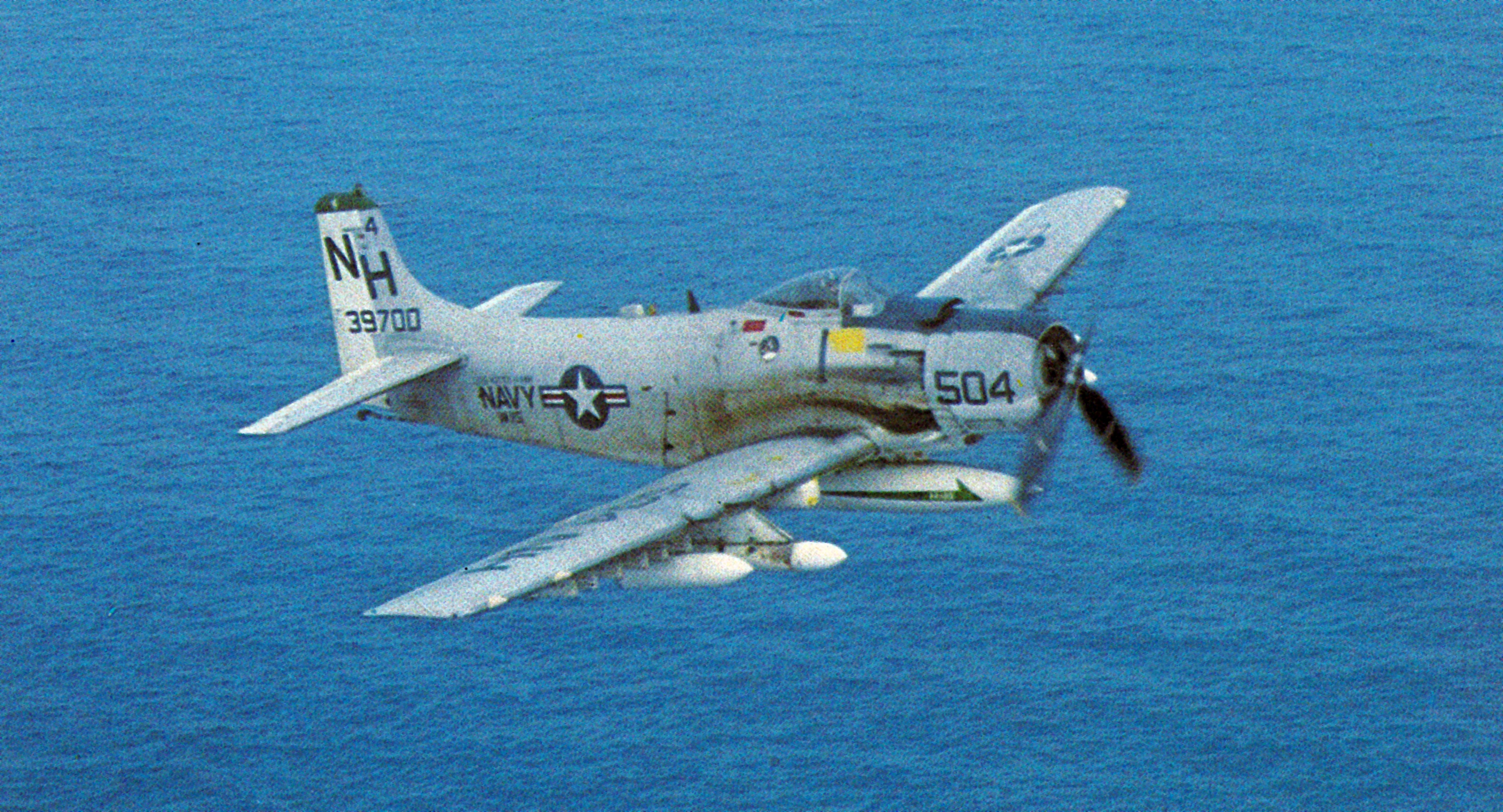
An A-1H of VA-115 in 1965

As American involvement in the Vietnam War began, the A-1 Skyraider was still the medium attack aircraft in many carrier air wings, although it was planned to be replaced by the Grumman A-6 Intruder as part of the general switch to jet aircraft. Skyraiders from Constellation and Ticonderoga participated in the first US Navy strikes against North Vietnam on 5 August 1964 as part of Operation Pierce Arrow in response to the Gulf of Tonkin Incident, striking against fuel depots at Vinh, with one Skyraider from Ticonderoga damaged by anti-aircraft fire, and a second from Constellation shot down, killing its pilot, Lieutenant Richard Sather.

As they were released from USN service, Skyraiders were introduced into the Republic of Vietnam Air Force (RVNAF). Skyraiders were also used by the United States Air Force (USAF), specifically Special Operations elements of the Tactical Air Command, for search and rescue air cover. They were also used by the USAF to perform one of the Skyraider's most famous roles — the "Sandy" helicopter escort on combat rescues. On 10 March 1966, USAF Major Bernard F. Fisher flew an A-1E mission and was awarded the Medal of Honor for rescuing Major "Jump" Myers at A Shau Special Forces Camp during the Battle of A Sau. USAF Colonel William A. Jones III piloted an A-1H on 1 September 1968 mission for which he was awarded the Medal of Honor. In that mission, despite damage to his aircraft and suffering serious burns, he returned to his base and reported the position of a downed US airman.

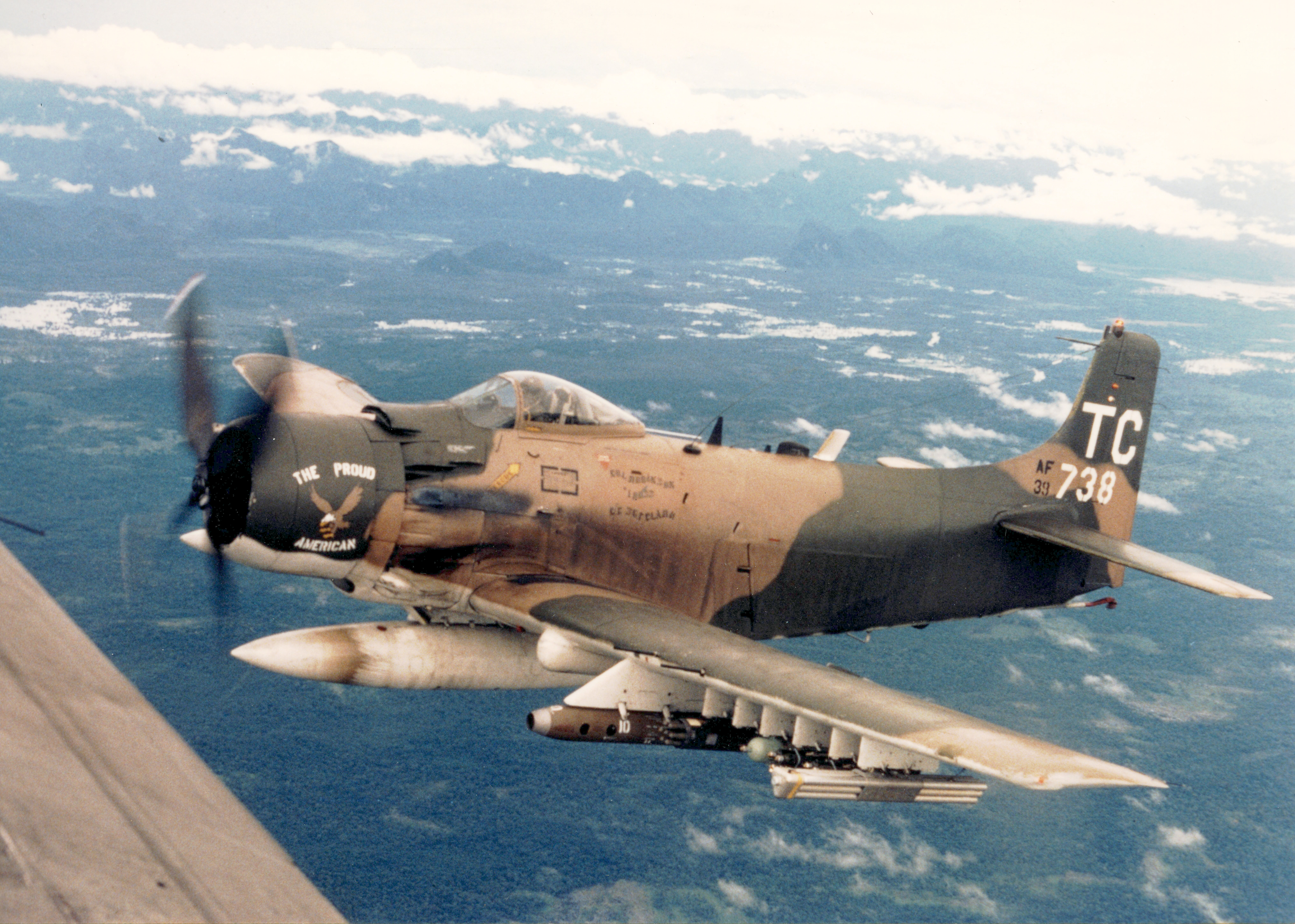
A-1H 52-139738 of the 1st SOS was the last USAF Skyraider lost on 28 September 1972.

A Skyraider from Navy Squadron VA-25 on a ferry flight from Naval Air Station Cubi Point (Philippines) to USS Coral Sea was lost to two Chinese MiG-17s on 14 February 1968: Lieutenant (jg) Joseph P. Dunn, USN flew too close to the Chinese island of Hainan and was intercepted. Lieutenant Dunn's A-1H Skyraider 134499 (Canasta 404) was the last Navy A-1 lost in the conflict. He was observed to survive the ejection and deploy his raft, but was never found. Initially listed as missing in action, he is now listed as killed in action and posthumously promoted to the rank of Commander. In October 1965, to highlight the dropping of the six millionth pound of ordnance, Commander Clarence J. Stoddard of VA-25, flying an A-1H, dropped a special, one-time-only object in addition to his other munitions – a toilet. During the Vietnam War, the US Navy lost 65 Skyraiders, 48 of these in combat.

The USAF used the naval A-1 Skyraider for the first time in Vietnam. As the conflict progressed, USAF A-1s were painted in camouflage, while USN A-1 Skyraiders were gray/white in color in contrast to the Korean War, when A-1s were painted dark blue. After November 1972, all A-1s in US service in Southeast Asia were transferred to the RVNAF. The Skyraider in Vietnam pioneered the concept of tough, survivable aircraft with long loiter times and large ordnance loads. The USAF lost 191 Skyraiders in Southeast Asia, 150 of these in combat. Of the combined total of 256 lost A-1s, five were shot down by surface-to-air missiles (SAMs), and 3 were shot down in air-to-air combat; the rest were shot down by anti-aircraft artillery.

==== Shoot-downs ====
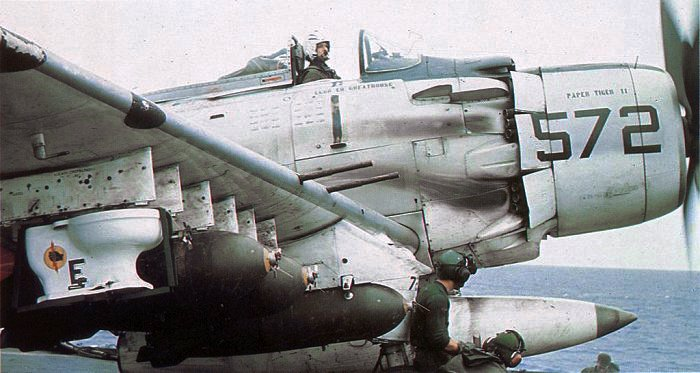
A-1H "Paper Tiger II" carrying a joke bomb made from a toilet in October 1965

During the conflict, US Navy Skyraiders twice used their cannon to shoot down Mikoyan-Gurevich MiG-17 jet fighters of the Vietnam People's Air Force (VPAF). The first, on 20 June 1965 by Lieutenant Clinton B. Johnson and Lt. (jg) Charles W. Hartman III of VA-25, was the first gun kill of the Vietnam War. The other was on 9 October 1966 by Lt. (jg) William T. Patton of VA-176.

=== Republic of Vietnam Air Force ===
The A-1 Skyraider was the close air support workhorse of the RVNAF for much of the Vietnam War. The US Navy began to transfer some of its Skyraiders to the RVNAF in September 1960, replacing the RVNAF's older Grumman F8F Bearcats. By 1962, the RVNAF had 22 of the aircraft in its inventory, and by 1968 an additional 131 aircraft had been received. Initially Navy aviators and crews were responsible for training their South Vietnamese counterparts on the aircraft, but over time responsibility was gradually transferred to the USAF.

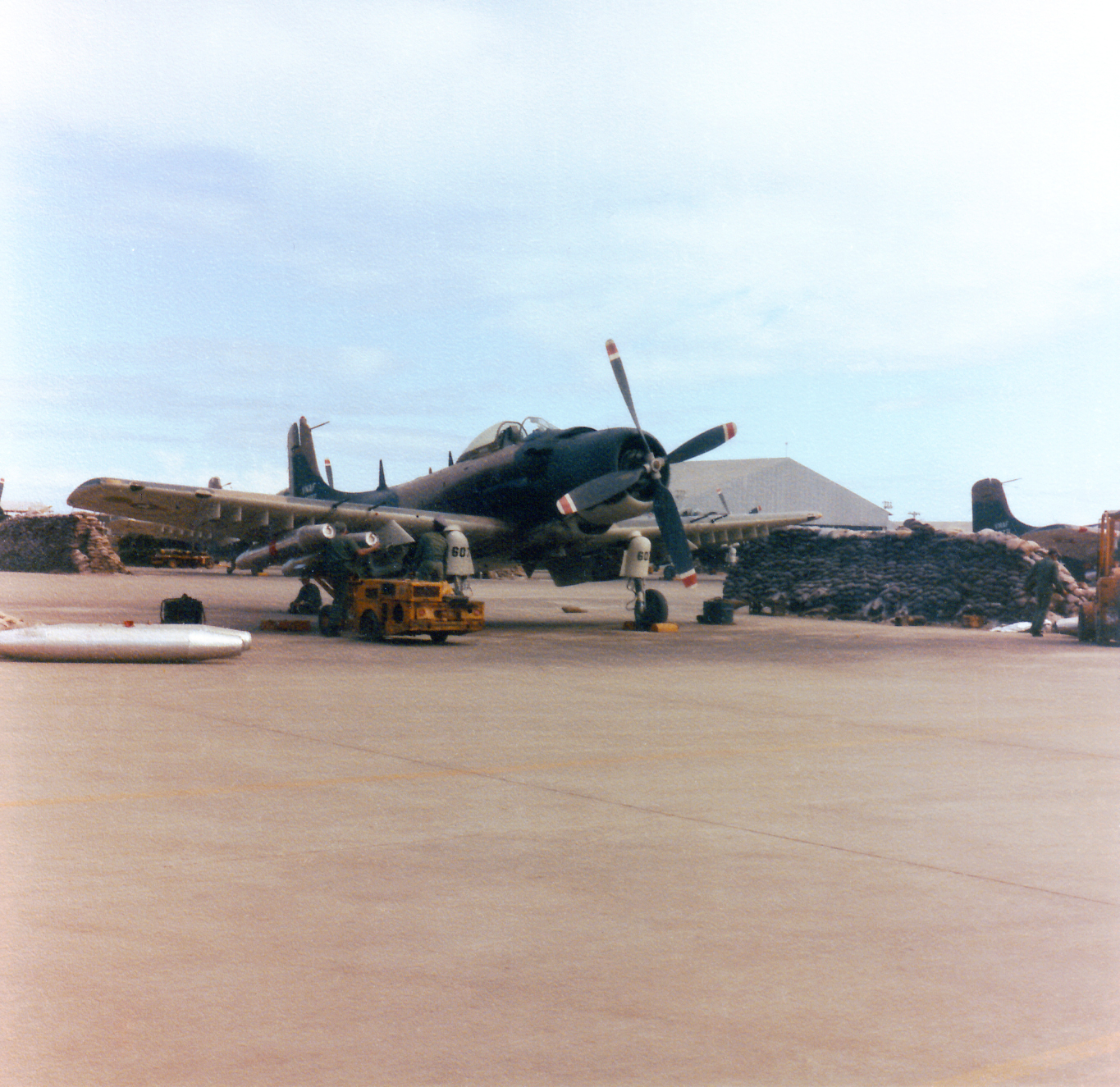
An A-1H Skyraider of the VNAF 516th Fighter Squadron being loaded with napalm at Da Nang Air Base in 1967

The initial trainees were selected from among RVNAF Bearcat pilots who had accumulated 800 to 1200 hours flying time. They were trained at NAS Corpus Christi, Texas, and then sent to NAS Lemoore, California for further training. Navy pilots and crews in Vietnam checked out the Skyraiders that were being transferred to the RVNAF, and conducted courses for RVNAF ground crews.

Over the course of the war, the RVNAF acquired a total of more than 350 Skyraiders, and was operating six A-1 squadrons by the end of 1965. About one third of these were A-1E/G. These were reduced during the period of Vietnamization from 1968 to 1972, as the US began to supply the South Vietnamese with more modern close air support aircraft, such as the A-37 Dragonfly and Northrop F-5, and at the beginning of 1968, only three of its squadrons were flying A-1s.

As the US ended its direct involvement in the war, it transferred the remainder of its Skyraiders to the South Vietnamese, and by 1973, all remaining Skyraiders in US inventories had been turned over to the RVNAF. Unlike their American counterparts, whose combat tours were generally limited to 12 months, individual South Vietnamese Skyraider pilots ran up many thousands of combat hours in the A-1, and many senior RVNAF pilots were extremely skilled in the operation of the aircraft. The last Skyraiders transferred to the VNAF were 23 A-1H/J and 21 A-1E/G in late 1972. In 1974, 61 aircraft were put in storage. One year later, 11 fled to Thailand (5 A-1E, 1 A-1G, 5 A-1H) and more than 40 Skyraiders were captured by North Vietnam.

A-1H 134600 was operated by the VNAF from 1965 to 1975. In 1997, it was acquired by the US Army Center of Military History before it was restored and put on display at the National Museum of the USAF in 2022 (painted as 52–139738).

=== United Kingdom ===
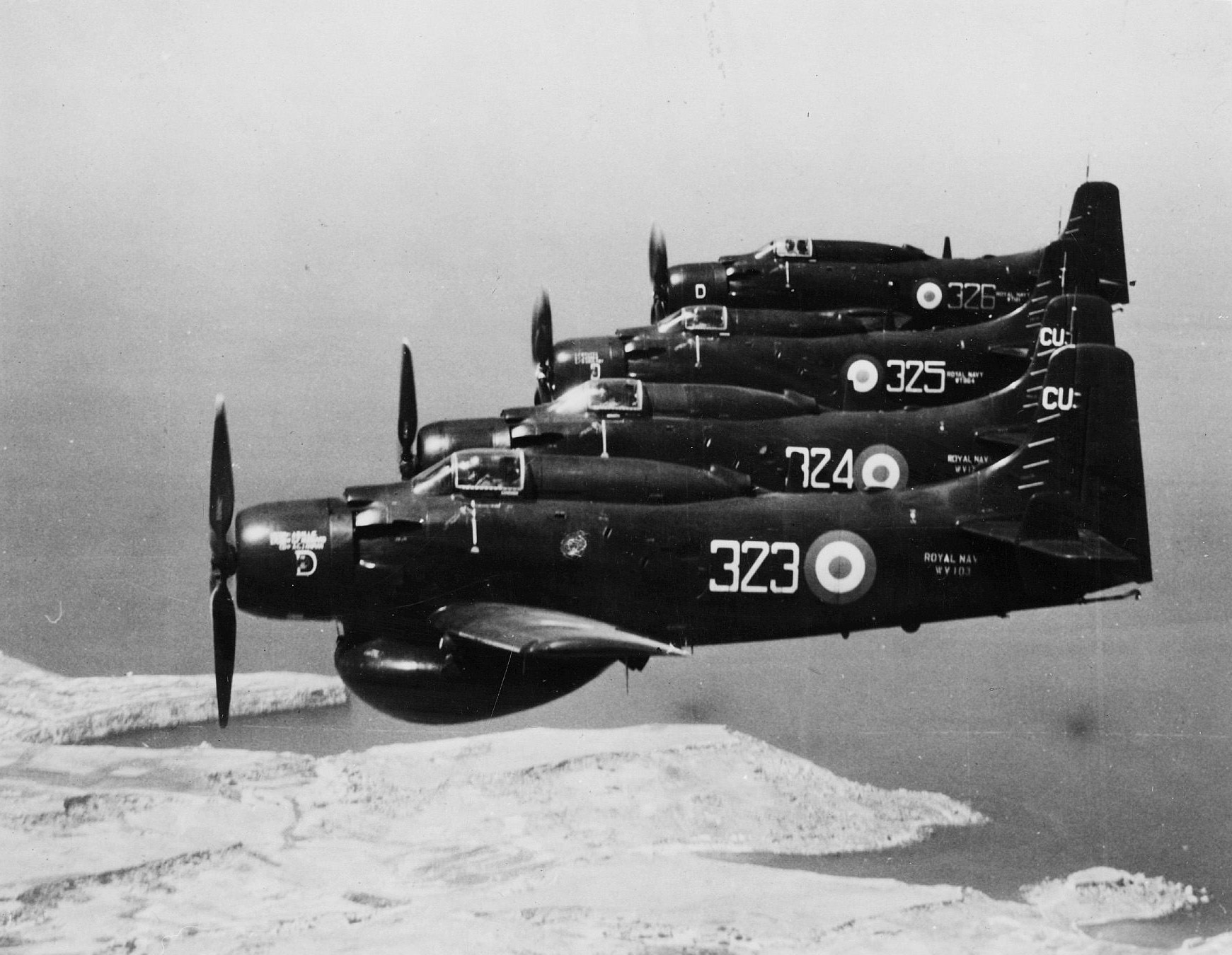
Four Royal Navy Douglas Skyraider AEW.1s from D Flight 849 Naval Air Squadron, based at Royal Naval Air Station Culdrose, in flight in the 1950s

The Royal Navy acquired 50 AD-4W early warning aircraft in 1951 through the Military Assistance Program. All Skyraider AEW.1s were operated by 849 Naval Air Squadron, which provided four-plane detachments for the British carriers. Flights from HMS Eagle (R05) and HMS Albion (R07) took part in the Suez Crisis in 1956. 778 Naval Air Squadron was responsible for the training of the Skyraider crews at RNAS Culdrose until July 1952.

In 1960, the Fairey Gannet AEW.3 started to replace the RN's Skyraiders, which was equipped with the same AN/APS-20 radar fitted to the Douglas aircraft. The last British Skyraiders were retired in 1962. In the late 1960s, the same AN/APS-20 radars taken from the Skyraiders were installed in Avro Shackleton AEW.2s of the Royal Air Force, which provided AEW coverage until being finally retired in 1991.

=== Sweden ===
Fourteen ex-British AEW.1 Skyraiders were sold to Sweden to be used by Svensk Flygtjänst AB between 1962 and 1976. All military equipment was removed and the aircraft were used as target tugs supporting the Swedish Armed Forces.

=== France ===
The French Air Force bought 20 ex-USN AD-4s as well as 88 ex-USN AD-4Ns and 5 ex-USN AD-4NAs with the former three-seaters modified as single-seat aircraft with removal of the radar equipment and the two operator stations from the rear fuselage. The AD-4N/NAs were initially acquired in 1956 to replace aging Republic P-47 Thunderbolts in Algeria.

The Skyraiders were first ordered in 1956 and the first was handed over to the French Air Force on 6 February 1958 after being overhauled and fitted with some French equipment by the local aircraft firm Sud Aviation. These aircraft were used until the end of the Algerian War. The aircraft were used by the 20e Escadre de Chasse (EC 1/20 "Aures Nementcha", EC 2/20 "Ouarsenis" and EC 3/20 "Oranie") and EC 21 in the close air support role armed with rockets, bombs and napalm.

The Skyraiders had only a short career in Algeria, but they nonetheless proved to be the most successful of all the ad hoc counter-insurgency aircraft deployed by the French. The Skyraider remained in limited French service until the 1970s. They were heavily involved in the civil war in Chad, at first with the Armée de l'Air, and later with a nominally independent Chadian Air Force staffed by French mercenaries. The aircraft also operated under the French flag in Djibouti and on the island of Madagascar. When France at last relinquished the Skyraiders it passed the survivors on to allied states, including Gabon, Chad and Cambodia (several aircraft from Gabon and Chad were recovered by French warbird enthusiasts and entered on the French civil register).

The French frequently used the aft station to carry maintenance personnel, spare parts and supplies to forward bases. In Chad they even used the aft station for a "bombardier" and his "special stores" – empty beer bottles – as these were considered as non-lethal weapons, thus not breaking the government-imposed rules of engagement, during operations against Libyan-supported rebels in the late 1960s and early 1970s.

== Variants ==
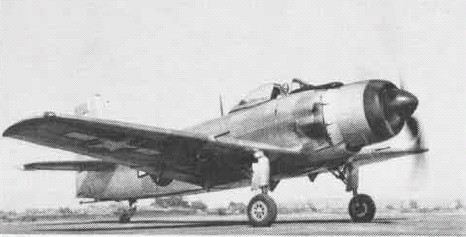
The XBT2D-1 in 1945

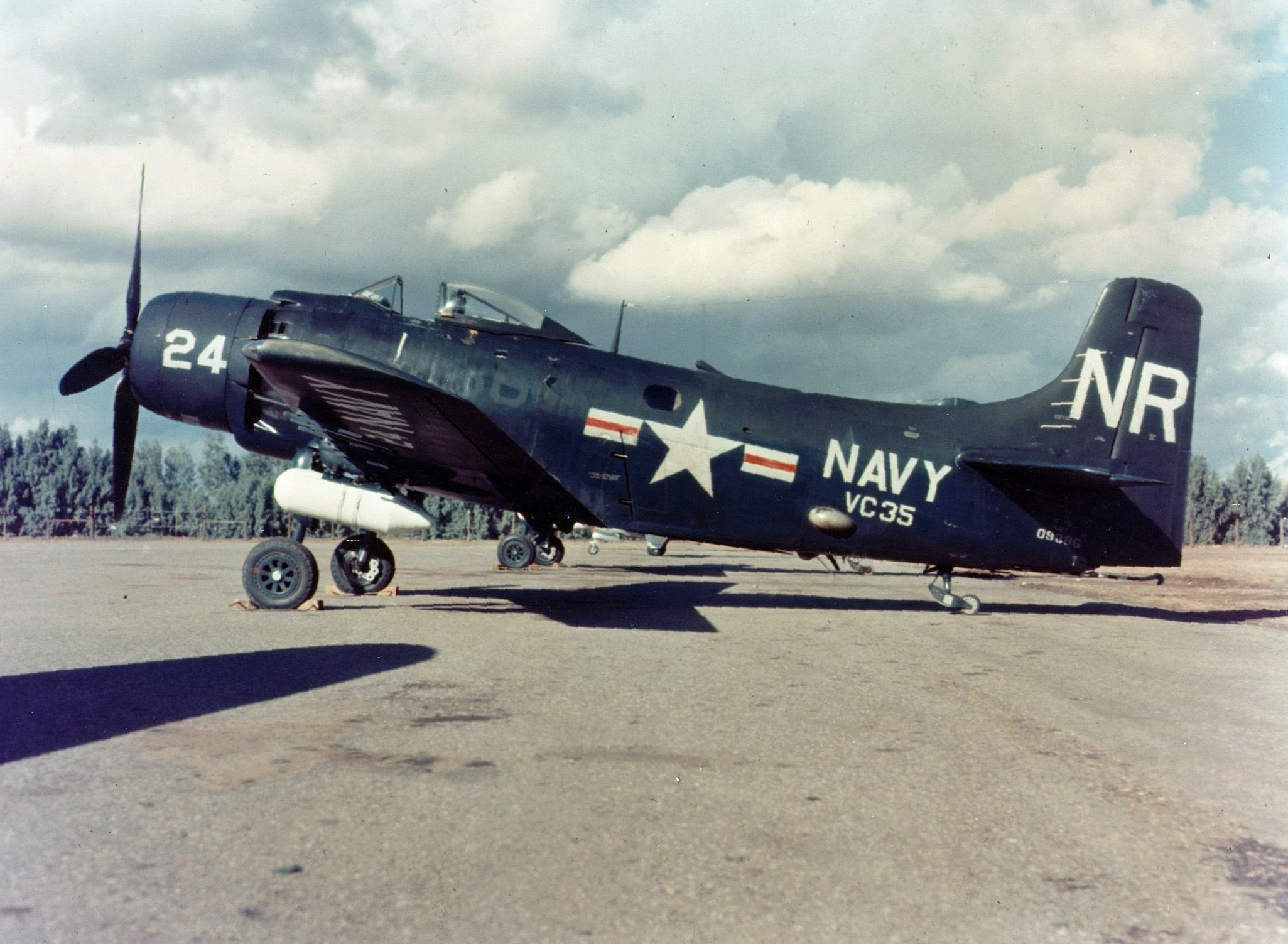
VC-35 AD-1Q in the late 1940s

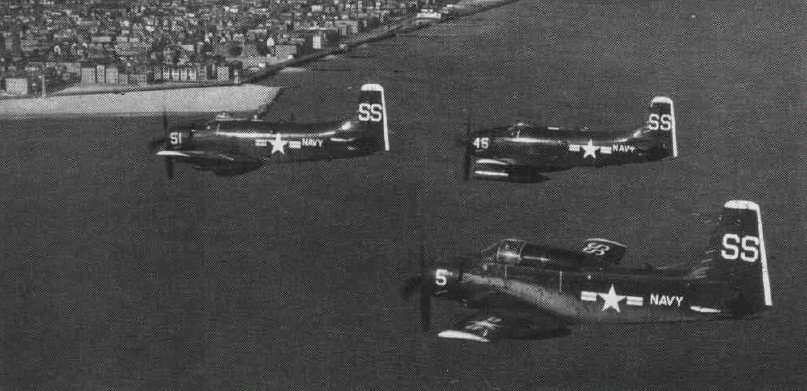
VC-33 AD-3Q, AD-4N, and AD-5N in 1955

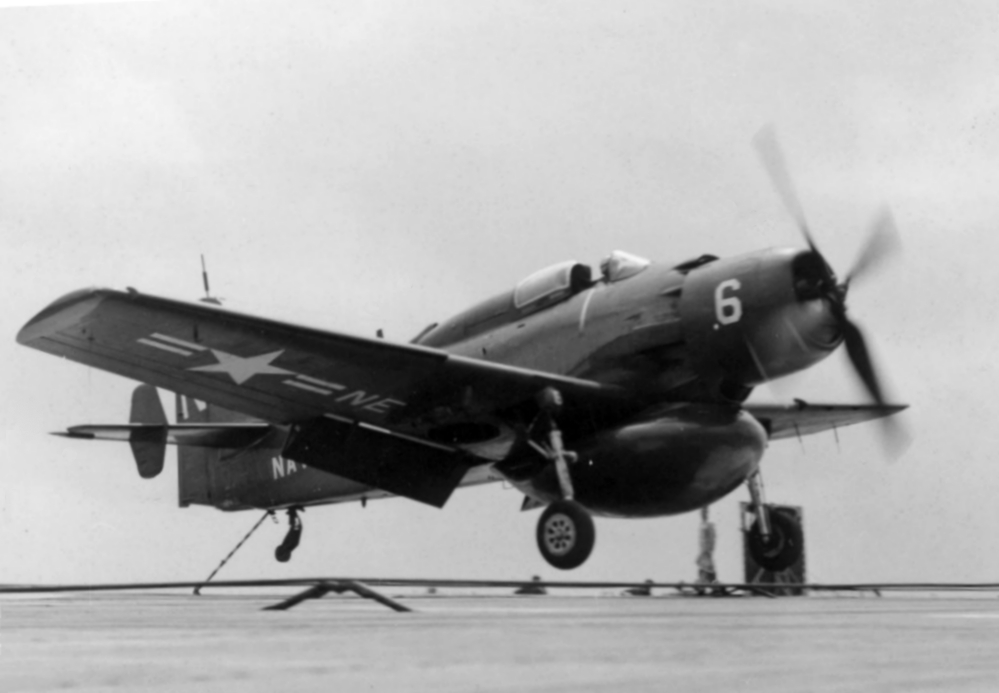
AD-4W AEW aircraft landing on USS Leyte

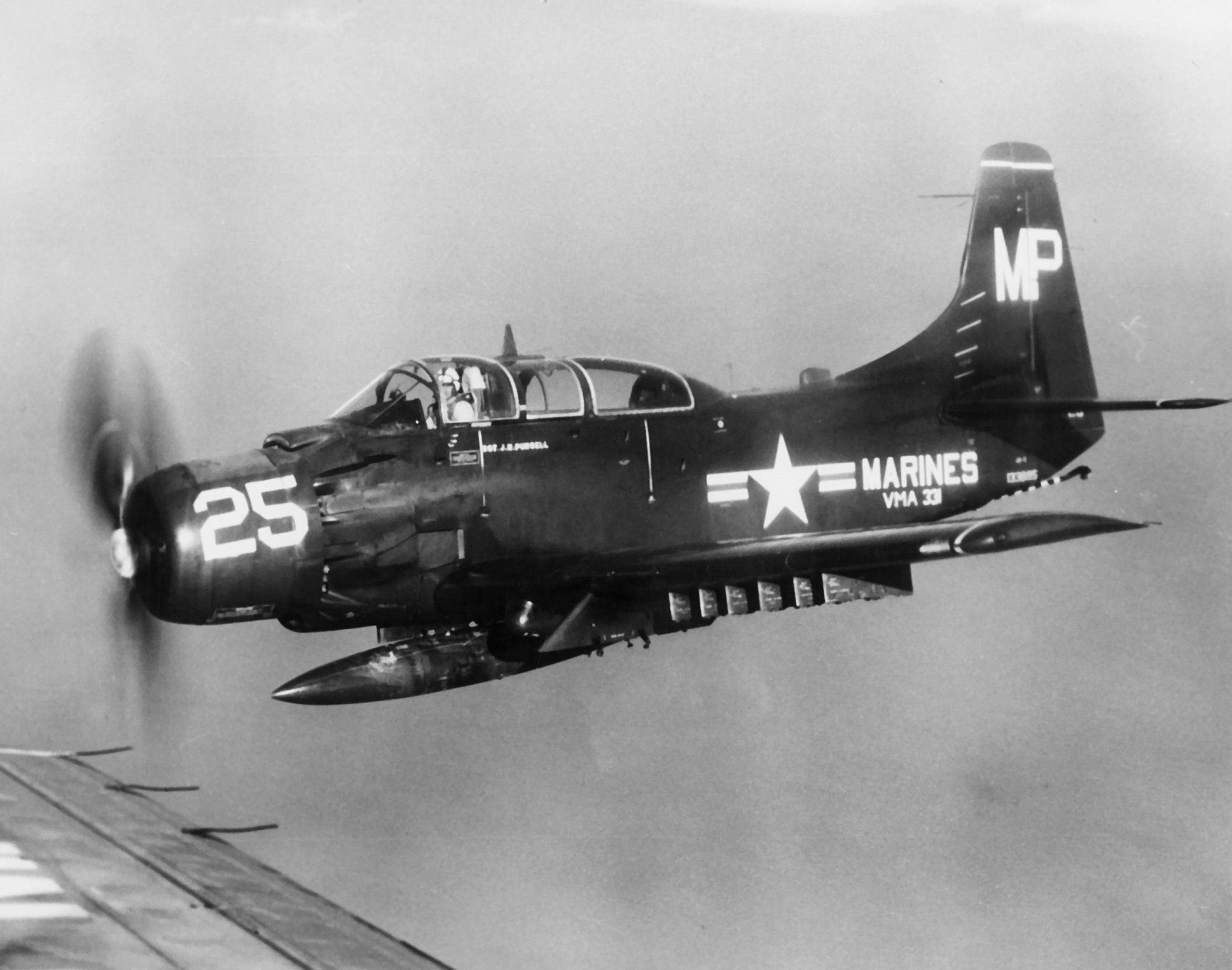
VMA-331 AD-5 in flight

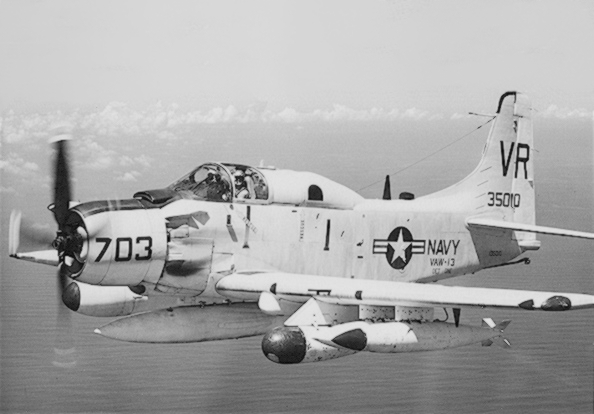
EA-1F (AD-5Q) ECM aircraft, BuNo 135010, of CVW-9 in 1966

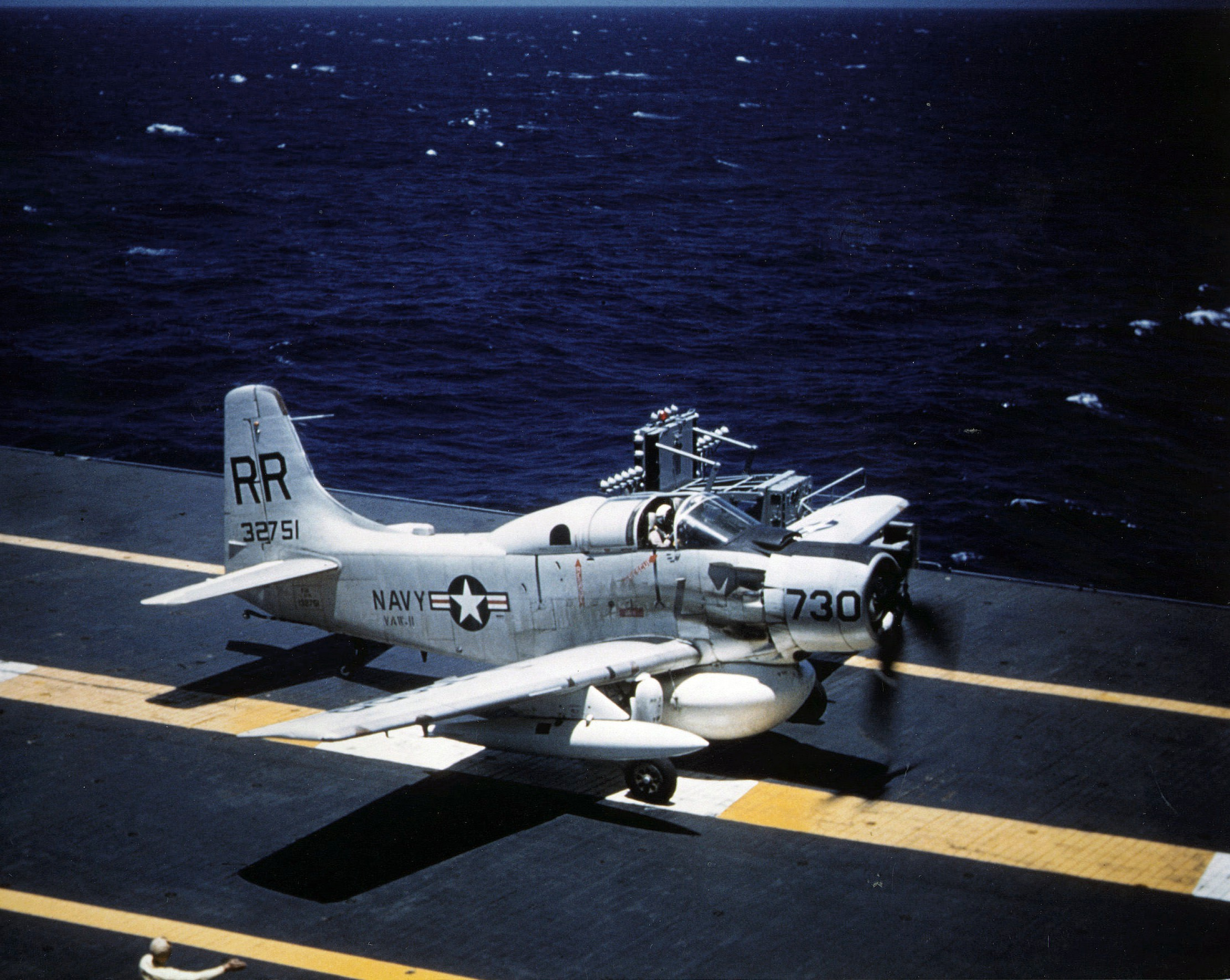
VAW-11 AD-5W aboard USS Kearsarge, 1958

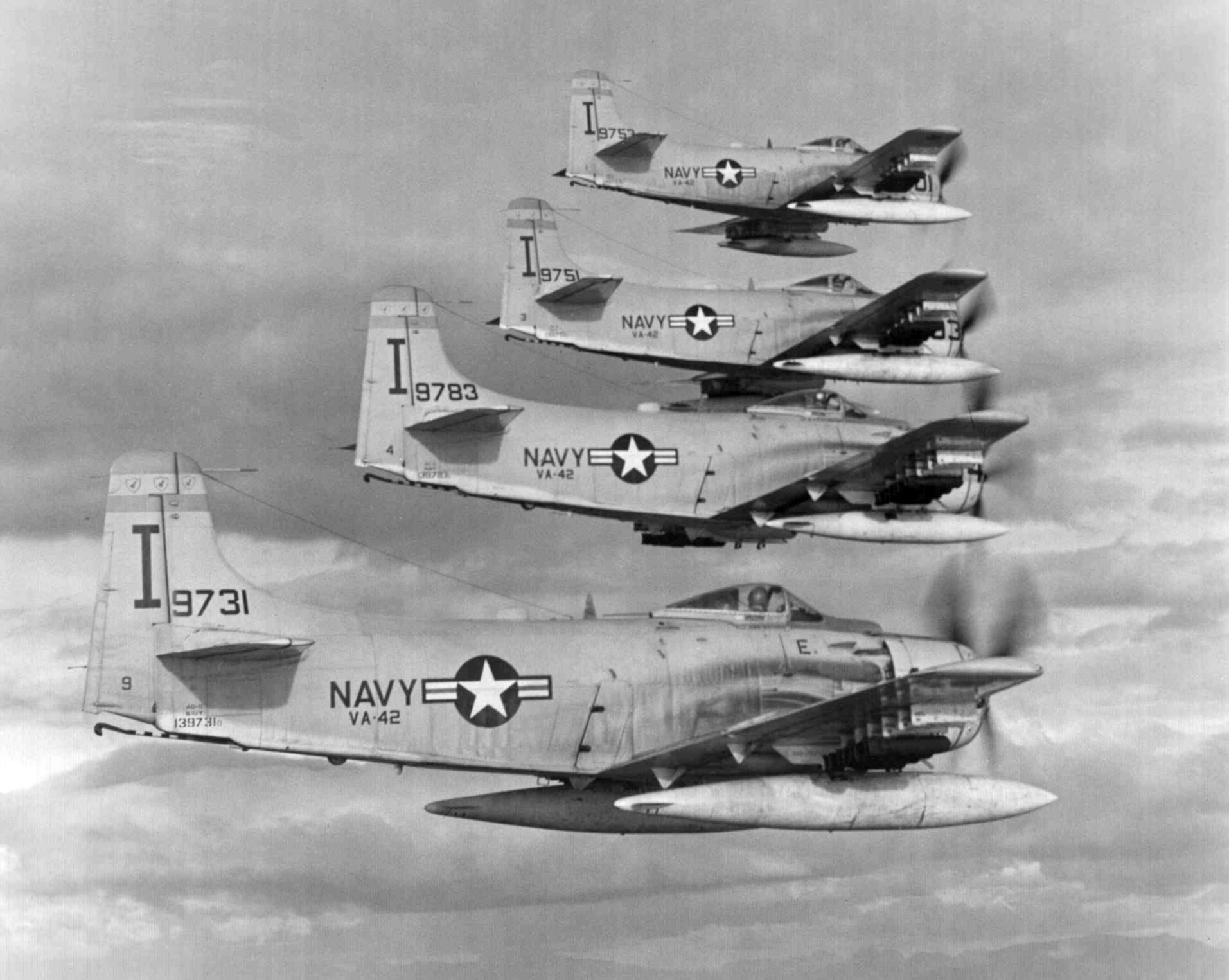
AD-6s from VA-42

XBT2D-1
Single-seat dive-bomber, torpedo-bomber prototype for the US Navy
XBT2D-1N
Three-seat night attack prototypes; only three aircraft built
XBT2D-1P
Photographic reconnaissance prototype; only one built
XBT2D-1Q
Two-seat electronics countermeasures prototype; one aircraft only
BT2D-2 (XAD-2)
Upgraded attack aircraft; one prototype only
AD-1
The first production model; 242 built
AD-1Q
Two-seat electronic countermeasures version of the AD-1; 35 built
AD-1U
AD-1 with radar countermeasures and tow target equipment, no armament and no water injection equipment
XAD-1W
Three-seat airborne early warning prototype. AD-3W prototype; one aircraft only.
AD-2
Improved model, powered by 2,700 hp (2,000 kW) Wright R-3350-26W engine; 156 built
AD-2D
Unofficial designation for AD-2s used as remote-control aircraft, to collect and gather radioactive material in the air after nuclear tests
AD-2Q
Two-seat electronics countermeasures version of the AD-2; 21 built
AD-2QU
AD-2 with radar countermeasures and target towing equipment, no armament and no water injection equipment; one aircraft only
AD-2W
AD-2 variant without offensive armament, but had an AN/APS-20A search radar, four antennae, and an extended canopy after section containing an air scoop.
XAD-2
Similar to XBT2D-1 except engine, increased fuel capacity
AD-3
Proposed turboprop version, initial designation of A2D Skyshark
AD-3
Stronger fuselage, improved landing gear, new canopy design; 125 built
AD-3S
Anti-submarine warfare model; only two prototypes were built
AD-3N
Three-seat night attack version; 15 built
AD-3Q
Electronics countermeasures version, countermeasures equipment relocated for better crew comfort; 23 built
AD-3QU
Target towing aircraft, but most were delivered as AD-3Qs
AD-3W
Airborne early warning version; 31 built
XAD-3E
AD-3W modified for ASW with Aeroproducts propeller
AD-4
Strengthened landing gear, improved radar, G-2 compass, anti-G suit provisions, four 20 mm (0.79 in) cannon and 14 Aero rocket launchers; 372 built
AD-4B
Specialized version designed to carry nuclear weapons, also armed with four 20 mm (0.79 in) cannon; 165 built plus 28 conversions
AD-4L
Equipped for winter operations in Korea; 63 conversions
AD-4N (A-1D)
Three-seat night attack version; 307 built
AD-4NA
Designation of 100 AD-4Ns without their night-attack equipment, but fitted with four 20 mm cannon, for service in Korea as ground-attack aircraft
AD-4NL
Winterized version of the AD-4N; 36 conversions
AD-4Q
Two-seat electronic countermeasures version of the AD-4; 39 built
AD-4W
Three-seat airborne early warning version; 168 built. A total of 50 AD-4Ws were transferred to the Royal Navy as Skyraider AEW Mk 1s.
AD-5 (A-1E)
Side-by-side seating for pilot and co-pilot, without dive brakes; 212 built; During the Vietnam War, many retired Skyraiders were refurbished for the US Air Force and the Vietnamese Air Force. AD-5/-5Q/-5W aircraft became "new" USAF A-1E attack aircraft.
AD-5N (A-1G)
Four-seat night attack version, with radar countermeasures; 239 built; A-1G was the US Air Force designation for refurbished AD-5N.
AD-5Q (EA-1F)
Four-seat electronics countermeasures version; 54 conversions
AD-5S
One prototype to test magnetic anomaly detector (MAD) anti-submarine equipment
AD-5U
The AD-5 when modified for target towing became the UA-1E in 1962. The same model converted as a transport was sometimes referred to as the AD-5R.
AD-5W (EA-1E)
Three-seat airborne early warning version with an AN/APS-20 radar installed; 218 were built
UA-1E
Utility version of the AD-5
AD-6 (A-1H)
Single-seat attack aircraft with three dive brakes, centerline station stressed for 3,500 lb (1,600 kg) of ordnance, 30 in (760 mm) in diameter, combination 14 in (360 mm) and 30 in (760 mm) bomb ejector and low/high altitude bomb director; 713 built
AD-7 (A-1J)
The final production model, powered by a R-3350-26WB engine, with structural improvements to increase wing fatigue life; 72 built

== Operators ==
- Cambodia
- Chad
- France
- Gabon
- South Vietnam
- Sweden
- United Kingdom
- United States

== Specifications (AD-6 / A-1H Skyraider) ==
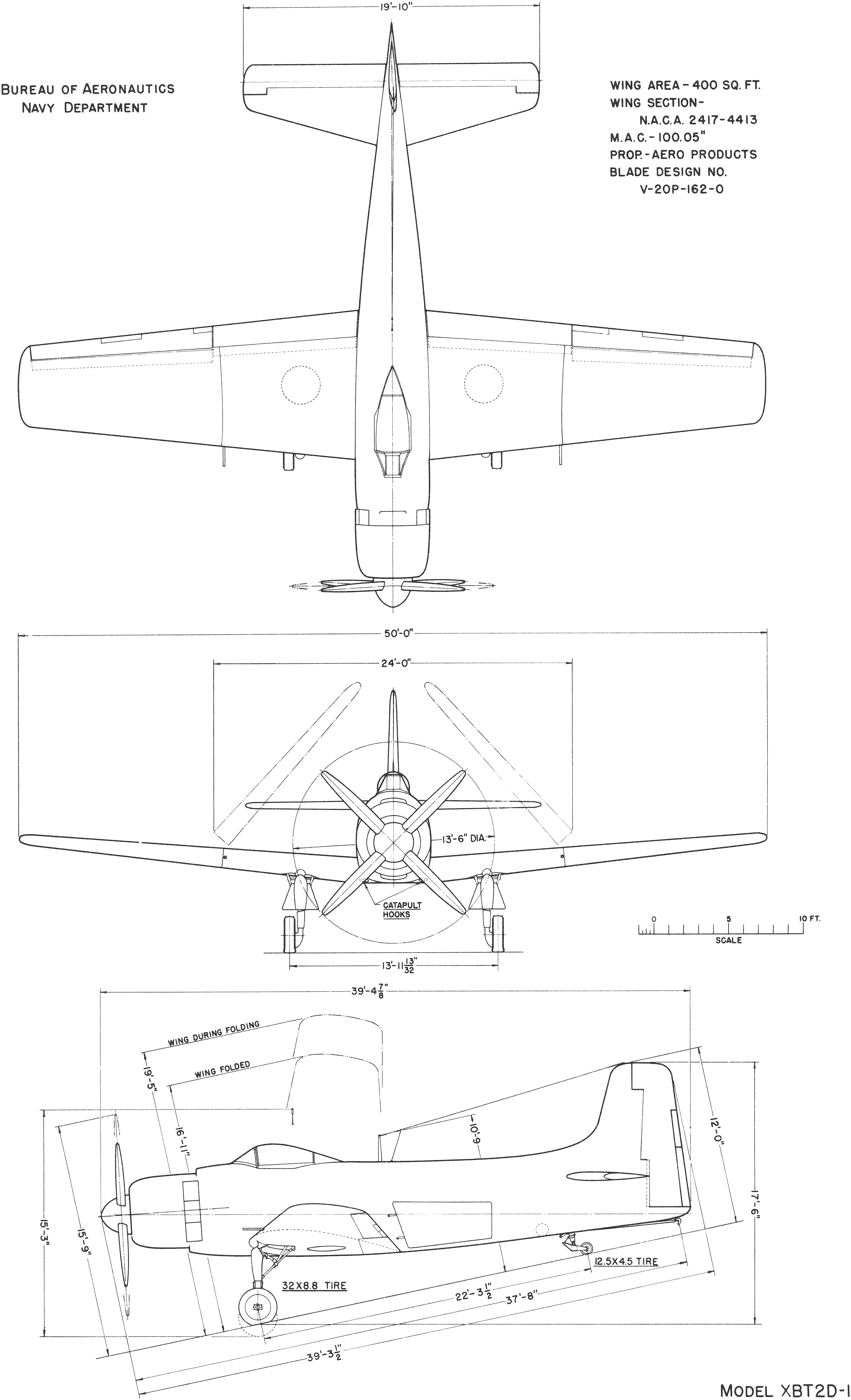
3-view line drawing of the Douglas XBT2D-1 Dauntless II

Data from McDonnell Douglas aircraft since 1920 : Volume I

General characteristics

- Crew: 1
- Length: 38 ft 10 in (11.84 m)
- Wingspan: 50 ft 0.25 in (15.2464 m)
- Height: 15 ft 8.25 in (4.7816 m)
- Wing area: 400.33 sq ft (37.192 m^{2})
- Airfoil: root: NACA 2417; tip: NACA 4413
- Empty weight: 11,968 lb (5,429 kg)
- Gross weight: 18,106 lb (8,213 kg)
- Fuel capacity: 380 US gal (320 imp gal; 1,400 L) internal tanks
- Powerplant: 1 × Wright R-3350-26WA Duplex-Cyclone 18-cylinder air-cooled radial piston engine, 2,700 hp (2,000 kW)
- Propellers: 4-bladed Aeroproducts constant-speed propeller

Performance

- Maximum speed: 322 mph (518 km/h, 280 kn) at 18,000 ft (5,500 m)
- Cruise speed: 198 mph (319 km/h, 172 kn)
- Range: 1,316 mi (2,118 km, 1,144 nmi)
- Service ceiling: 28,500 ft (8,700 m)
- Rate of climb: 2,850 ft/min (14.5 m/s)
- Wing loading: 46.6 lb/sq ft (228 kg/m^{2})
- Power/mass: 0.149 hp/lb (0.245 kW/kg)

Armament

- Guns: 4 × 20 mm AN/M3 cannon with 200 rounds per gun
- Hardpoints: 15 external hardpoints with a capacity of 10,500 lb (4,800 kg) per NAVWEPS manual 01-40-ALF-1, with provisions to carry combinations of:
  - Other: bombs, torpedoes, mine dispensers, unguided rockets, improvised toilet bombs, and gun pods.

== Naming ==
The A-1 Skyraider received various nicknames including: "Spad" and "Super Spad" (derived from the aircraft's AD designation, its relative longevity in service and an allusion to the "Spad" aircraft of World War I), "Able Dog" (phonetic AD), "the Destroyer", "Hobo" (radio call sign of the US Air Force's 1st Air Commando/1st Special Operations Squadron), "Firefly" (a call sign of the 602nd ACS/SOS), "Zorro" (the call sign of the 22nd SOS), "The Big Gun", "Old Faithful", "Old Miscellaneous", "Fat Face" (AD-5/A-1E version, side-by-side seating), "Guppy" (AD-5W version), "Q-Bird" or "Queer Bird" (AD-1Q/AD-5Q versions), "Flying Dumptruck" (A-1E), "Sandy" (the 602nd ACS/SOS call sign for Combat Search And Rescue helicopter escort), and "Crazy Water Buffalo" (South Vietnamese nickname).

== See also ==
Related development

- Douglas A2D Skyshark

Aircraft of comparable role, configuration, and era

- Aichi B7A
- Martin AM Mauler
- Westland Wyvern

Related lists

- List of attack aircraft
- List of military aircraft of the United States
