= Adam A700 =

Prototype aircraft

A700 AdamJet
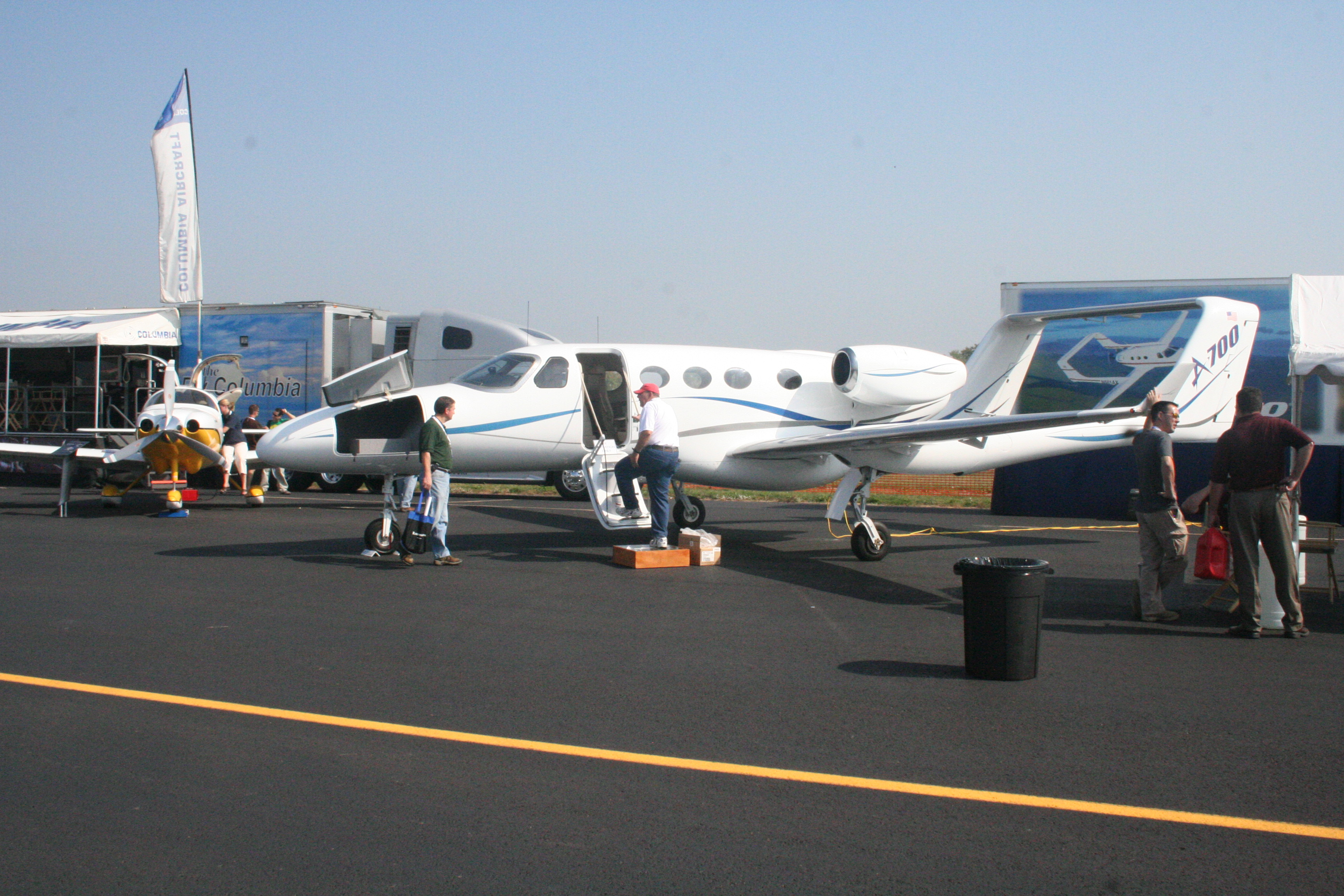

General information
- Type: Civil utility aircraft
- Manufacturer: Adam Aircraft Industries
- Status: Development ended April 2009
- Number built: 2

History
- First flight: 28 July 2003
- Developed from: Adam A500

The Adam A700 AdamJet was a proposed six-seat civil very light jet developed by Adam Aircraft Industries starting in 2003. The aircraft was developed in parallel with the generally similar Adam A500, although while that aircraft is piston-engined, the A700 is powered by two Williams FJ33 turbofans. The two models have about 80% commonality.

The prototype A700 first flew on July 28, 2003. Two conforming prototypes were built.

== Development ==
Adam Aircraft ceased operations on 11 February 2008 and filed for Chapter 7 bankruptcy liquidation on 19 February 2008, prior to the certification or delivery of any production A700s.

In April 2008 Adam Aircraft was purchased from bankruptcy by AAI Acquisition Inc who have indicated their intention to continue with certification of the aircraft.

Industrial Investments, the Russian company that purchased Adam Aircraft, restarted work on the A700 and in May 2008 had 60 employees back at work. Industrial Investments reportedly ordered 75 A700s prior to Adam Aircraft's bankruptcy. AAI had initially intended to certify the A700 in the first quarter of 2010, but citing the 2008 financial crisis, President and CEO Jack Braly announced on 28 October 2008 that "Flight test and other development activity have been suspended". Braly indicated that the company's investment team and board of directors are reviewing the economic and market conditions and will decide on a new schedule for certifying the A700.

The Federal Aviation Administration accepted the previous certification data that Adam Aircraft recorded, which would have greatly simplified certification efforts by the new company, however in April 2009 Adam Aircraft ceased operations and laid off all its staff, ending development of the A700.

In April 2011 Triton Aerospace, the new holder of the type certificate, indicated that they would concentrate on the A500 and had no plans to continue development of the A700, even though they had two disassembled examples.

== Design ==
Diagram showing the external centerline fuel tank on the aircraft

As with the earlier-designed A500 piston-engined model, the A700 featured a straight tapered wing, a central fuselage, and twin wing-mounted booms which supported aft twin rudders linked by a high horizontal stabilizer. Unlike on the A500, the A700's two engines were mounted on the sides of the fuselage, in a non-centerline thrust arrangement, eliminating one of the design advantages of the A500 configuration.

In order to balance the twin rear-mounted engines properly, the forward fuselage was lengthened by 4 feet. In the A500, the front engine is balanced by the rear engine and empennage. In the A700, the longer front fuselage balances the rear engines and empennage.

== Specifications (A700) ==
Data from Adam Aircraft website

General characteristics

- Crew: one or two pilots
- Capacity: four to six passengers, depending on cabin configuration
- Length: 40 ft 9 in (12.42 m)
- Wingspan: 44 ft 0 in (13.41 m)
- Height: 9 ft 7 in (2.92 m)
- Airfoil: NASA LS(1)-0417
- Empty weight: 5,550 lb (2,517 kg)
- Max takeoff weight: 9,350 lb (4,241 kg)
- Powerplant: 2 × Williams FJ33-4A turbofan engine, 1,350 lbf (6.0 kN) thrust each

Performance

- Maximum speed: 382 mph (615 km/h, 332 kn)
- Stall speed: 73 mph (117 km/h, 63 kn)
- Range: 1,611 mi (2,593 km, 1,400 nmi)
- Service ceiling: 41,000 ft (12,000 m)
- Rate of climb: 2,550 ft/min (13.0 m/s)

Avionics

- Avidyne Entegra (Glass Cockpit)

== See also ==
- Very light jet

Related development

- Adam A500

Aircraft of comparable role, configuration, and era

- Cessna Citation Mustang
- Eclipse 500
- Embraer Phenom 100
