= Aircraft type club =

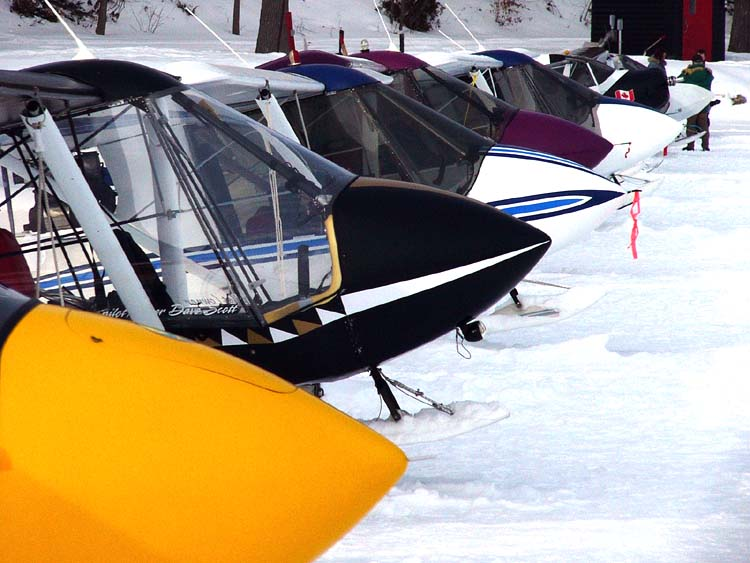
An aircraft type-club fly-in: A line-up of Quad City Challenger II ultralight aircraft at the annual International Challenger Owners Association Ski Fly-in at Montebello Quebec, 29 January 2005.

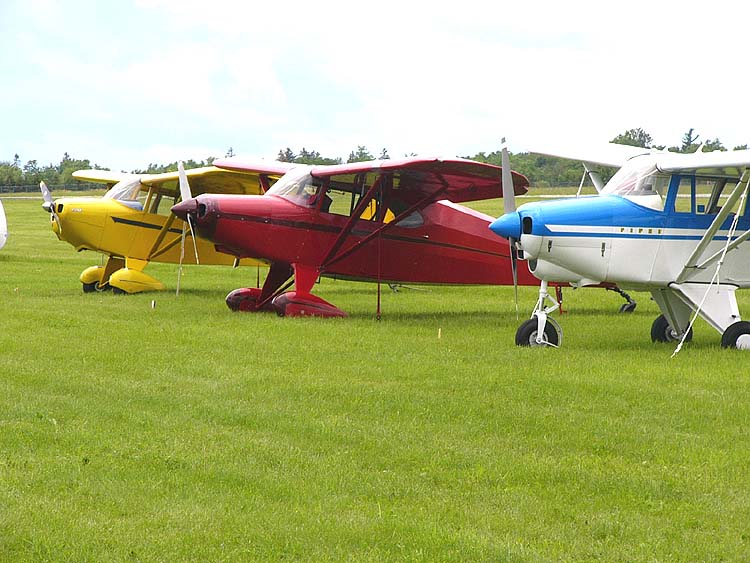
Pipers line-up at the annual convention of the Short Wing Piper Club. The aircraft are (l-r) a Piper PA-17 Vagabond, a Piper PA-16 Clipper and a Piper PA-22-150 Tri-Pacer The SWPC supports a range of aircraft from the PA-15 to the PA-22

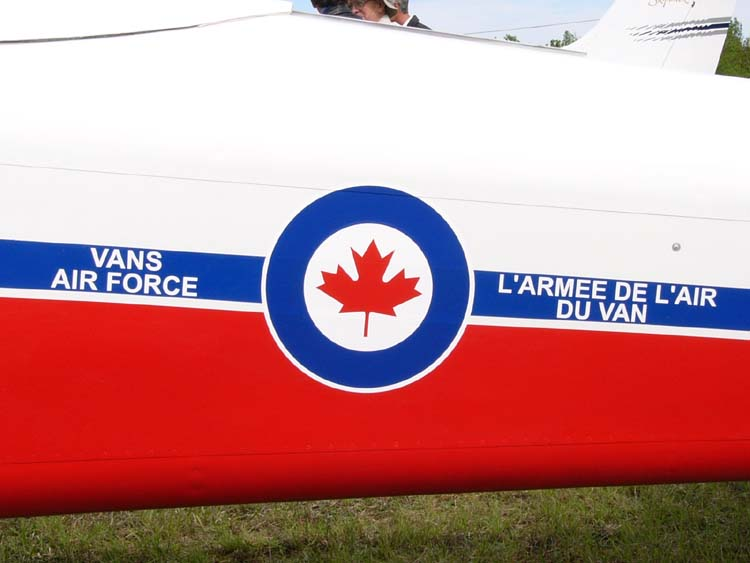
As this Van's Aircraft RV-8 paint scheme shows, some aircraft owners even paint their aircraft type club membership on their aircraft.

Aircraft type clubs are organizations that provide information and support to a single aircraft type or a group of aircraft types from the same manufacturer or family of aircraft.

There are hundreds of aircraft type clubs around the world providing services to most certified, amateur-built, warbird and ultralight aircraft types that have been produced in any significant numbers. In some cases, especially those dealing with highly popular aircraft designs, there may be two or more competing type clubs offering services for the same aircraft type or types.

Most aircraft type clubs are independent of the manufacturer. While the majority are organized as not-for-profit associations, some type clubs are run as for-profit businesses.

== Services ==
Type clubs vary in the services they offer and how they work. Some clubs are run by one volunteer enthusiast, using a free web service to provide a website or forum. These often have minimal publications or services. Some of the largest types clubs have full-time professional staff and offer a full range of services. Many are non-profits, but some are for-profit companies.

Services offered by type clubs can include:

- A magazine
- News and events
- A website
- Technical question support from aircraft type experts
- Buyers guides
- Conventions
- Fly-ins
- Information on Airworthiness Directives
- Information on Supplemental Type Certificates
- Type-specific classified ads
- Background and historical information
- Maintenance tips
- Aircraft parts
- Operating tips
- Maintenance and aircraft systems courses
- Aircraft type conversion training
- Type-specific insurance (at group discounted rates)
- Formation flying training
- Scholarships

== Listing of notable aircraft type clubs ==
- Cessna_150/152_club The Cessna 150/152 Club is the largest aircraft type club in the world.
