= Skagit Regional Airport =

Airport in Washington, United States

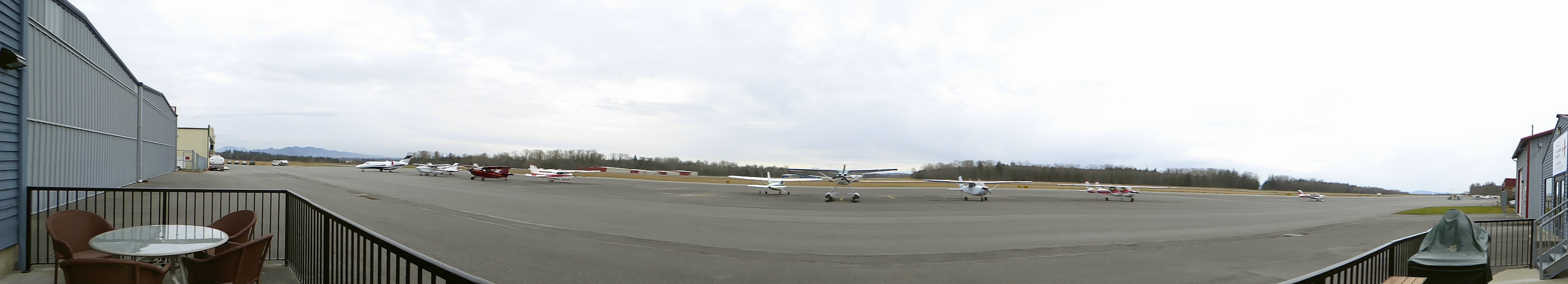
- IATA: MVW; ICAO: KBVS; FAA LID: BVS

Summary
- Airport type: Public
- Owner: Port of Skagit County
- Location: Burlington / Mount Vernon, Washington
- Elevation AMSL: 144 ft / 44 m
- Coordinates: 48°28′15″N 122°25′15″W
- Interactive map of Skagit Regional Airport

Runways
Direction	Length		Surface
Direction	ft	m	Surface
4/22	3,000	914	Asphalt
11/29	5,480	1,670	Asphalt

Statistics (2016)
- Aircraft operations: 61,900
- Based aircraft: 132
- Source: Federal Aviation Administration

Skagit Regional Airport (IATA: MVW, ICAO: KBVS, FAA LID: BVS) is a public airport located 3 mi (4.8 km) west of the central business district of Burlington and northwest of Mount Vernon, both cities in Skagit County, Washington, United States. The airport is owned by the Port of Skagit County. It is situated in the Bayview Industrial Park.

Although most U.S. airports use the same three-letter location identifier for the FAA and IATA, Skagit Regional Airport is assigned BVS by the FAA and MVW by the IATA (which assigned BVS to Breves Airport in Breves, Pará, Brazil).

== Facilities and aircraft ==
Skagit Regional Airport covers an area of 1,847 acres (747 ha) which contains two asphalt paved runways with pilot activated lights: 11/29 measuring: 5,480 x 100 ft (1,670 x 30 m) and 4/22: 3,000 x 60 ft (914 x 18 m).

For the 12-month period ending December 31, 2016, the airport had 61,900 aircraft operations, an average of 169 per day: 97% general aviation, 3% air taxi and <1% military. At that time there were 132 aircraft based at this airport: 113 single engine, 8 multi-engine, 3 jet, 7 helicopters, and 1 ultralights.

In the 1980s, Harbor Airlines operated commercial passenger flights into and out of MVW to Seattle-Tacoma International and to Oak Harbor, WA, using Britten-Norman Islander aircraft.

The Heritage Flight Museum is located on the south side of the airport.

== Cargo Carriers ==
Airlines	Destinations
Ameriflight	Seattle–Boeing
FedEx Feeder	Seattle/Tacoma

== See also ==
- List of airports in Washington
