= Port of Skagit County =

Port of Skagit
- Port of Skagit logo
- Founded: November 17, 1964
- Coordinates: 48°28′21.75″N 122°24′53.88″W
- Commissioners: Kevin E. Ware; Steven Omdal; Bill Shuler
- Executive Director: Patsy Martin
- Port details

Details
- Size: Airport and Industrial Park total area: 1,835 acres (743 ha)
- No. of berths: 460
- Employees: Total Workers Employed (Airport + BBIP + Marina): 1,250
- Longest Runway: 5,475 feet (1,669 m)
- Guest Moorage: 2400 Lineal Feet
- Total Businesses Operated on Port Grounds: 92
- Aircraft Operations per Day: 159
- Website: Official Website

The Port of Skagit is a port authority that owns and operates four key facilities in Skagit County, Washington. They include the Skagit Regional Airport, Bayview Business Park, the SWIFT Center and the La Conner Marina. The Port of Skagit also maintains an extensive trail system and several properties it owns.

== Airport ==
Skagit Regional Airport, situated in the heart of the Bayview Business Park, is a popular general aviation facility offering terminal facilities, aviation fuels, restaurant, and a variety of aircraft maintenance and related services including qualified flight instruction.

== Marina ==
La Conner Marina is located on the Swinomish Channel. It acts as a passage to the San Juan Islands. The La Conner Marina has both covered and uncovered berths, and also owns land which is leased to several surrounding marina-related private businesses.

== Business Park ==
Near the airport, the Port of Skagit operates a large business park where it provides utilities and leases land and buildings. It also runs an incubator program here, where companies with a sound business plan and strong potential for sales growth, are offered lease rates at one-third the normal market rate during a business’s first year, two-thirds the normal rate in the second year, and full price by the third year. This service is meant to help local small businesses grow.

== Port district ==
The Port of Skagit County is an independent, self-supporting government entity in Skagit County. The Port is under the control of a three elected commissioners and is administered by an executive director.

== History ==
A vote from local residents established the Port of Skagit County on Nov. 1964, under the logo of "Building Today while Planning Tomorrow". The first Commissioners were Chris Knudsgon, George Dynes, and Norman Ovenell. In 1965, the Skagit Regional Airport was jointly deeded to the Port of Anacortes and the Port of Skagit County, though Anacortes gave up its share of ownership in 1975. The airport was initially created during the second World War as an auxiliary air field to the Whidbey Island Naval Air Station.

The Bayview Business Park was initially created in the mid 1970s. There were nearly 1,500 acres (6.1 km^{2}) of industrial zoned property at the Port of Skagit County's airport area. The goal was to create a new crop of jobs in the area.

The La Conner Marina was initially created June 1970, with 200 moorages. Approximately 3,000 attendees were there, including U.S. Senator Henry M. Jackson.

The Port has had a few notable tenants over the years. Draper Valley farms built a state-of-the-art factory in the BBIP in the early 1970s, and PACCAR built began construction on a piece of land bought from the port in 1979. The PACCAR testing center is still in use today.

== Environment ==
In January 2007 the Port of Skagit County was issued a National Pollution Discharge Elimination System (NPDES) Phase II Municipal Stormwater Permit. The NPDES Permit Stormwater Program is intended to help the Port reduce the amount of stormwater pollution reaching Padilla Bay.
