= PZL-230 Skorpion =

Polish ground-attack aircraft project

Skorpion
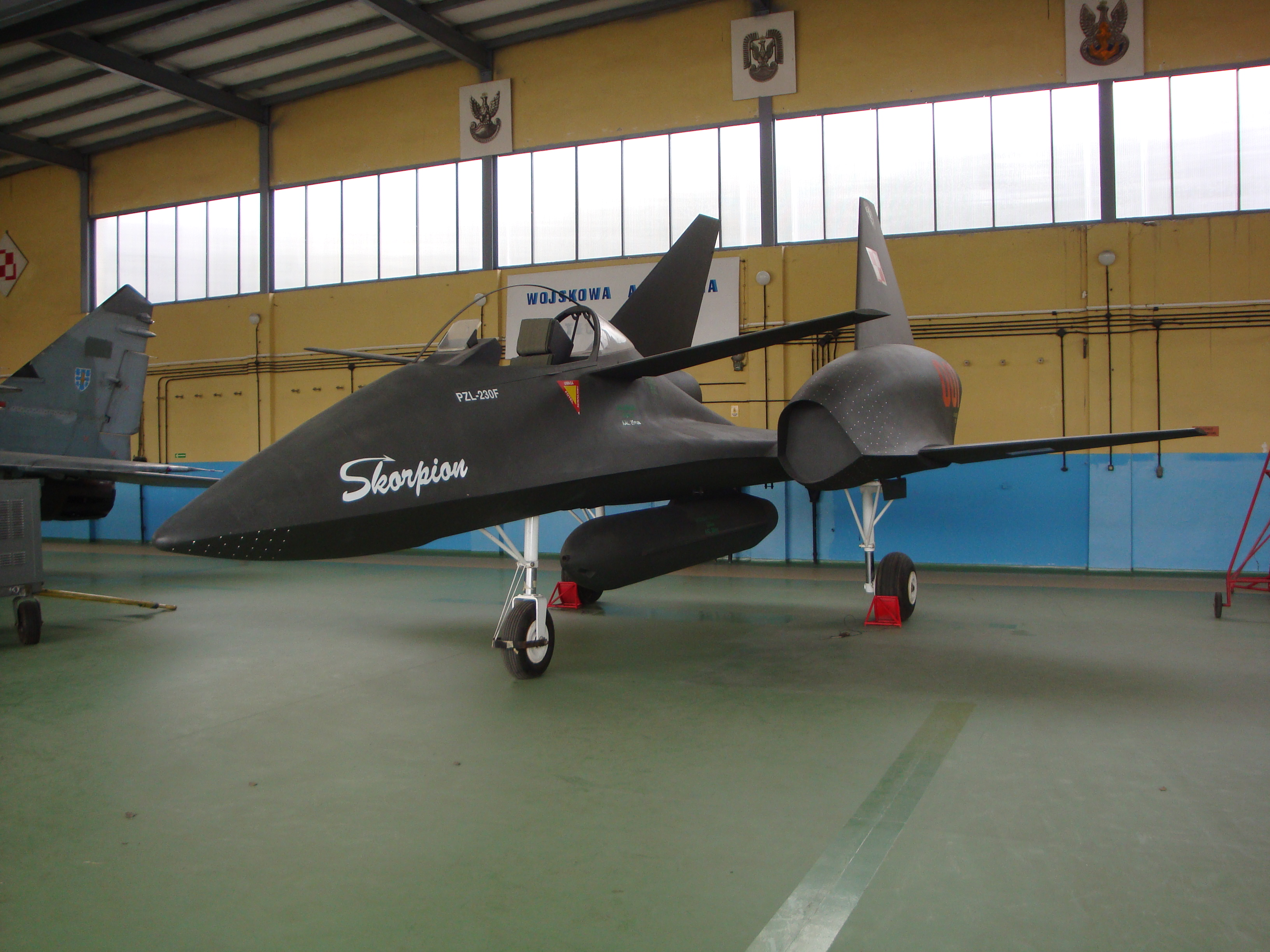
- PZL-230F Skorpion mockup

General information
- Type: Ground attack aircraft
- Manufacturer: Państwowe Zakłady Lotnicze
- Designer: Andrzej Frydrychewicz
- Status: Cancelled
- Primary user: Polish Air Force
- Number built: 0

The PZL-230 Skorpion (scorpion) was a proposed Polish low-cost attack aircraft. It was being developed by Polish manufacturer PZL Warszawa-Okecie in the late 1980s and early 1990s.

In the late 1980s, PZL started developing a new aircraft intended to combine high manoeuvrability, short take-off and landing (STOL) performance, and the ability to carry a 2,000 kg payload while remaining a low-cost platform to procure and to operate. Original designs for the aircraft revolved around a twin-turboprop engine. At one point, the Pratt & Whitney Canada PT6A-67A engine was selected to power the type. However, the proposal was radically changed following a decision to submit it to a requirement issued for Polish Air Force which sought a light strike and battlefield support aircraft; accordingly, the payload was doubled and the speed was raised dramatically. The revised design was instead powered by a pair of Pratt & Whitney Canada PW305 turbofan engines. Named the Skorpion, it featured a fuselage afterbody that was blended into the wing along with a set of small canards behind the cockpit.

In June 1994, the Polish Ministry of Defense announced that the Skorpion programme would receive no further funding from the Polish government. The abrupt withdrawal of support after having been recognised two years earlier as a government-approved programme was widely attributed to the formation of a new left-wing Polish government led by Waldemar Pawlak. Despite fears that this was the programme's end, PZL decided to initially continue with development independently. By late 1994, according to the aircraft's chief designer, Andrzej Frydrychewicz, the aerodynamic configuration of the Skorpion, with the exception of the tail, had been frozen. As of its 1994 redesign, performance estimates for the Skorpion included a maximum level speed of 540 kn (1,000 km/h), a 32,800 ft (10,000 m) service ceiling and a 300 km (160 nmi) combat radius. By December 1994, the stealth characteristics of the aircraft had been deemphasised. According to the company's estimates, the official development cost was promoted as being 11,500 billion złotys ($65 million). However, Frydrychewicz speculated that this figure was relatively optimistic and may have been produced with political interests in mind.

== Development and design ==
=== Origins and early progress ===
According to aerospace publication Flight International, the origins of the Skorpion were within an earlier proposal for a twin-turboprop ground-attack aircraft. Reportedly, the Polish initiative had drawn some influence from a study performed by British Aerospace (BAE), known as the Small Agile Battlefield Aircraft, which was to be a relatively manoeuvrable, short take-off and landing (STOL) aircraft capable of carrying a 2,000 kg payload. Work commenced on the initiative at Warsaw-based aircraft manufacturer PZL Warszawa-Okecie during 1990. Early on, the company had several objectives for the aircraft, such as for it to be cheap and easy to construct, as well as to modify, the latter of which being accomplish via to its modular design. It also required an ability to take-off and land on a runway of about 250 m in length, travel at speeds of up to 640 km/h, be armed with a 25 mm cannon and be able to carry up to 2,000 kg of both Warsaw Pact and NATO munitions. Later versions were named 'D', and included a 'DT' training aircraft and a 'DB' combat variant.

Early on, the Pratt & Whitney Canada PT6A-67A turboprop engine was selected to power the type; these were to be mounted in a pusher configuration on either side of the rear fuselage. Reportedly, at this point in development, the majority of the proposed aircraft's technology was to be derived from PZL Okecie's earlier PZL-130 Orlik trainer aircraft. The company chose to submit its design to the Polish Air Force for a light strike and battlefield support aircraft. During the years immediately following the fall of Communism in Eastern Europe, the air force's requirement was hotly contested by Poland's various aircraft manufacturers, each of which were eager to secure their uncertain future. A total of three rival concepts, ranging from radical to relatively conservative and with varying degrees of international participation.

Upon its selection to meet the Polish Air Force's strike requirement, the design underwent a radical redesign in order to meet the various performance attributes specified, leading to it becoming a considerable faster aircraft capable of carrying up to double the original design's weapons payload. The Skorpion was soon recognised as a Government-approved programme, which was viewed as a close step towards receiving state funding to support its development. By late 1992, PZL Okecie was displaying a fullscale mock-up of the Skorpion.

By this point, it had been redesigned for a second time with the engines now mounted inside fairings in the wing while other features, such as fly-by-wire and stealth characteristics, had also been incorporated. Aspects of the Skorpion were viewed as being relatively advanced elements for a company who had previously specialised in the production of agricultural and utility aircraft. The subsequent redesigned aircraft was powered by a pair of Pratt & Whitney Canada PW305 turbofan engines, rated at 23.2 kN (5,200 lbf) thrust; however, as the design continued to be developed, the PW305 engine was later determined to be incapable of producing sufficient levels of thrust. Following its revision, the Skorpion was powered by a pair of Honeywell LF 507 turbofan engines; these were to be mounted upon pylons positioned on top of the rear fuselage and between the aircraft's twin tailfins in a side by side configuration.

=== Termination of support and later development ===
In June 1994, the Polish Ministry of Defense announced that the Skorpion programme would receive no further funding from the government. Speaking at the time, Brigadier General Henryk Mika, director of the Ministry of Defense's military-procurement department, no further work will be done on the programme and that it had little sense to start on a clean-sheet programme when an existing design can be developed to meet the Polish Air Force's requirements. This abrupt reversal of fortunes has been attributed to the rise of a new left-wing Polish government led by Waldemar Pawlak. News of this termination quickly led to fears that the programme was effectively dead. However, PZL-Okecie decided to commit their own internal resources to keeping development of the type in action for some time. At one stage, the company was considering using an advanced turboprop-powered aircraft design to serve as a technology development platform in support of the Skorpion programme.

By late 1994, according to chief designer Andrzej Frydrychewicz, the aerodynamic configuration of the Skorpion, except for the tail, had been frozen. Wind tunnel tests were expected to decide whether to adopt either a butterfly-style tail or a classical fin-and-tailplane configuration. To provide additional yaw control for improved weapon-aiming capabilities, an aerodynamic fin was to be mounted underneath the nose. The Skorpion featured a three-surface control arrangement, using foreplanes mounted either side of the cockpit. The Skorpion was intended to use a fly-by-wire flight control system to be provided by American company Lear Astronics. As part of the agreement to provide the fly-by-wire system, Lear also agreed to provide at no cost the computer that controls the special trim system (STS) fitted upon the PZL-130 Orlik.

As of its 1994 redesign, performance estimates for the Skorpion included a maximum level speed of 540 kn (1,000 km/h), a 9,970 m (32,710 ft) service ceiling and a 300 km (160 nmi) combat radius. According to the manufacturer, it was intended to perform a 180° turn within five seconds and flown at an angle of attack of up to 50°. Amongst the Skorpion's proposed armaments and equipment was various Western-sourced elements, including an internally-mounted 25mm GAU-12/U Equalizer cannon, along with a pod-mounted 30mm GAU-8/A Avenger cannon. The cockpit was also to be fitted with a Martin-Baker Mk.10 ejection seat. There was considerable controversy over the level of Polish content on the aircraft; some politicians had called for the programme to be de-funded if it comprised less than 70 per cent Polish components. Other figures promoted pragmatism and the value of international co-operation to acquire technology and know-how to advance Poland's own indigenous industry.

By December 1994, the stealth characteristics of the Skorpion had been deemphasised. The reason given for not assigning a high value to this aspect of the design was a belief that, as the Skorpion was expected to normally be flown at very low altitudes during combat missions and thereby the inherent detectability challenges posed by such flight profiles, even highly-effective stealth characteristics would have little effect on its detectability. Despite this change in focus, at least 50 per cent of the aircraft's structure was still anticipated to be composed of carbon fibre composite materials. As PZL Okecie lacked the in-house capability to produce this structure, co-operation on the manufacturing process was discussed with several foreign aviation companies, including British Aerospace (BAE) and Construcciones Aeronáuticas SA (CASA). According to Flight International, CASA was being viewed as the frontrunner to serve as the Skorpion's manufacturing partner. During 1993, it was reported that the aircraft had generated interest amongst the Israeli Air Force along with some aerospace manufacturers in Israel.

Speaking in late 1994, Frydrychewicz stated that proposals for co-operation on the Skorpion received little enthusiasm from the other Polish aircraft manufacturers; he speculated that the overwhelming attitudes of these companies was that it was better to deal directly with the Polish government than to indirectly receive a share of funding from PZL Warszawa-Okecie for their part of the programme. According to the company's estimates, the official development cost was promoted as being PLN 150 million ($65 million); however, Frydrychewicz speculated that this figure was relatively optimistic and likely to be a deliberate tactic in order to secure approval to get the programme started. Frydrychewicz intended to use the Orzel trainer as a stepping stone to develop several technologies for the Skorpion; it has been claimed that the two design shared various elements.

== Specifications (PZL-230D) ==
PZL-230 concepts; top to bottom, PZL-230, PZL-230F, PZL-230D

General characteristics

- Crew: 1 (pilot)
- Length: 10 m (32 ft 10 in)
- Wingspan: 12.1 m (39 ft 8 in)
- Height: 4.2 m (13 ft 9 in)
- Wing area: 25.4 m^{2} (273 sq ft)
- Gross weight: 11,000 kg (24,251 lb)

Performance

- Maximum speed: 1,000 km/h (620 mph, 540 kn)
- Maximum speed: Mach 0.85
- Combat range: 300 km (190 mi, 160 nmi)
- Service ceiling: 12,000 m (39,000 ft)
- Rate of climb: 90 m/s (18,000 ft/min)
- Takeoff distance: 300 metres (980 ft)

Armament

- Internal gun; up to 4,000 kilograms (8,800 lb) ordnance

== See also ==
Aircraft of comparable role, configuration, and era

- Atlas Carver
- British Aerospace P.1233-1 Saba
- FMA SAIA 90
- IAR 95
- Novi Avion
- Scaled Composites ARES
- Fairchild Republic A-10 Thunderbolt II

Related lists

- List of attack aircraft
- List of Polish military aircraft
