= Critical engine =

Engine whose failure would most adversely affect aircraft performance or handling

The critical engine of a multi-engine fixed-wing aircraft is the engine that, in the event of failure, would most adversely affect the performance or handling abilities of an aircraft. On propeller aircraft, there is a difference in the remaining yawing moments after failure of the left or the right (outboard) engine when all propellers rotate in the same direction due to the P-factor. On turbojet and turbofan twin-engine aircraft, there usually is no difference between the yawing moments after failure of a left or right engine in no-wind condition.

== Description ==
When one of the engines on a typical multi-engine aircraft becomes inoperative, a thrust imbalance exists between the operative and inoperative sides of the aircraft. This thrust imbalance causes several negative effects in addition to the loss of one engine's thrust. The tail-design engineer is responsible for determining the size of vertical stabilizer that will comply with the regulatory requirements for the control, and performance of an aircraft after engine failure, such as those set by the Federal Aviation Administration and European Aviation Safety Agency. The experimental test pilot and flight-test engineer use flight testing to determine which of the engines is the critical engine.

== Factors affecting engine criticality ==
=== Asymmetrical yaw ===
When one engine fails, a yawing moment develops, which applies a rotational force to the aircraft that tends to turn it toward the wing that carries the engine that failed. A rolling moment might develop, due to the asymmetry of the lift in each wing, with a greater lift generated by the wing with the operating engine. The yawing and rolling moments apply rotational forces that tend to yaw and roll the aircraft towards the failed engine. This tendency is counteracted by the pilot's use of the flight controls, which include the rudder and ailerons. Due to P-factor, a clockwise rotating right-hand propeller on the right wing typically develops its resultant thrust vector at a greater lateral distance from the aircraft's center of gravity than the clockwise rotating left-hand propeller (Figure 1). The failure of the left-hand engine will result in a larger yawing moment by the operating right-hand engine, rather than vice versa. Since the operating right-hand engine produces a larger yawing moment, the pilot will need to use larger deflections of the flight controls or a higher speed in order to maintain control of the aircraft. Thus, the failure of the left-hand engine has a greater impact than failure of the right-hand engine, and the left-hand engine is called the critical engine. On aircraft with propellers that rotate counter-clockwise, such as the de Havilland Dove, the right engine would be the critical engine.

Most aircraft that have counter-rotating propellers do not have a critical engine defined by the above mechanism because the two propellers are made to rotate inward from the top of the arc; both engines are critical. Some aircraft, such as the Lockheed P-38 Lightning, purposefully have propellers that rotate outward from the top of the arc, to reduce downward air turbulence, known as downwash, on the central horizontal stabilizer, which makes it easier to fire guns from the aircraft. These engines are both critical, but more critical than inward-rotating propellers.

Aircraft with propellers in a push-pull configuration, such as the Cessna 337, may have a critical engine, if failure of one engine has a greater negative effect on aircraft control or climb performance than failure of the other engine. The failure of a critical engine in an aircraft with propellers in a push-pull configuration typically will not generate large yawing or rolling moments.

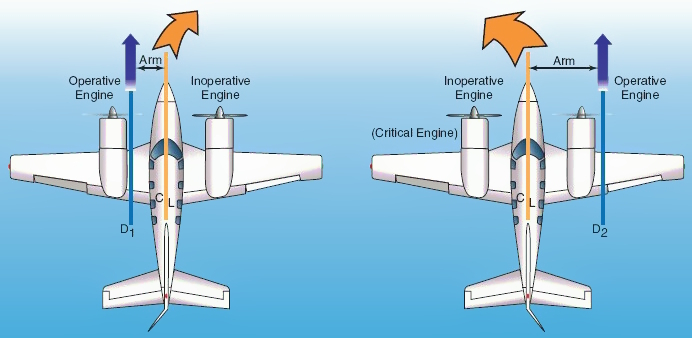
Fig. 1. With clockwise-rotating propellers (as seen by the pilot), the operating right-hand engine will produce a more severe yawing moment towards the dead engine, thus making the failure of the left-hand engine critical.

=== Effect of the critical engine on minimum control speed ===
The standards and certifications that specify airworthiness require that the manufacturer determine a minimum control speed (V_{MC}) at which a pilot can retain control of the aircraft after failure of the critical engine, and publish this speed in the section of the airplane flight manual on limitations. The published minimum control speeds (V_{MC}s) of the aircraft are measured when the critical engine fails or is inoperative, so the effect of the failure of the critical engine is included in the published V_{MC}s. When any one of the other engines fails or is inoperative, the actual V_{MC} that the pilot experiences in flight will be slightly lower, which is safer, but this difference is not documented in the manual. The critical engine is one of the factors that influences the V_{MC}s of the aircraft. The published V_{MC}s are safe regardless of which engine fails or is inoperative, and pilots do not need to know which engine is critical in order to safely fly. The critical engine is defined in aviation regulations for the purpose of designing the tail, and for experimental test pilots to measure V_{MC}s in flight. Other factors like bank angle, and thrust have a much greater effect on V_{MC}s than the difference of a critical and a non-critical engine.

The Airbus A400M has an atypical design, because it has counter-rotating propellers on both wings. The propellers on a wing rotate in opposite directions to each other: the propellers rotate from the top of the arc downward toward each other. If both engines on a wing are operative, the shift of the thrust vector with increasing angle of attack is always towards the other engine on the same wing. The effect is that the resultant thrust vector of both engines on the same wing does not shift as the angle of attack of the airplane increases as long as both engines are operating. There is no total P-factor, and failure of either outboard engine (i.e.: engines 1 or 4) will result in no difference in magnitude of the remaining thrust yawing moments with increasing angle of attack, only in the direction left or right. The minimum control speed during takeoff (V_{MC}) and during flight (V_{MCA}) after failure of either one of the outboard engines will be the same unless boosting systems that may be required for controlling the airplane are installed on only one of the outboard engines. Both outboard engines would be critical.

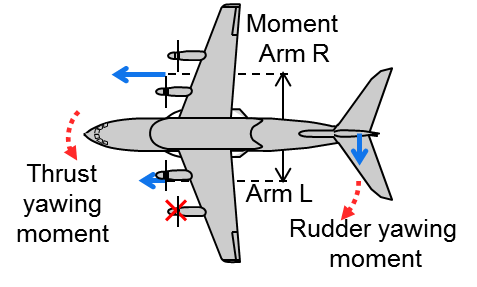
Figure 2. A400M, counter-rotating propellers on each wing; the most important yawing moments after failure of engine 1

If an outboard engine fails, such as engine 1 as shown in Figure 2, the moment arm of the vector of the remaining thrust on that wing moves from in between the engines to a bit outside of the remaining inboard engine. The vector itself is 50% of the opposite thrust vector. The resulting thrust yawing moment is much smaller in this case than for conventional propeller rotation. The maximum rudder yawing moment to counteract the asymmetrical thrust can be smaller and, consequently, the size of the vertical tail can be smaller. The feathering system of the large, 8-bladed, 17.5-foot (5.33 m) diameter drag propellers must be automatic, very rapid and failure-free, to ensure the lowest possible propeller drag following a propulsion-system malfunction. If not, a failure of the feathering system of an outboard engine will increase propeller drag, which in turn enhances the thrust yawing moment considerably, thus increasing actual V_{MC(A)}. The control power generated by the small vertical tail and rudder alone is low by design. Only rapid reduction of thrust of the opposite engine, or increased airspeed can restore the required control power to maintain straight flight following the failure of a feathering system. Designing and approving the feathering system for this airplane is challenging for design engineers and certification authorities.

On airplanes with very powerful engines, the problem of asymmetrical thrust is solved by applying automatic thrust asymmetry compensation, but this has consequences for takeoff performance.

== Elimination ==
The Rutan Boomerang is an asymmetrical aircraft designed with engines with slightly different power outputs to produce an aircraft that eliminates the dangers of asymmetric thrust in the event of failure of either of its two engines.
