= Richard E. Gray =

American naval aviator (1945-1982)

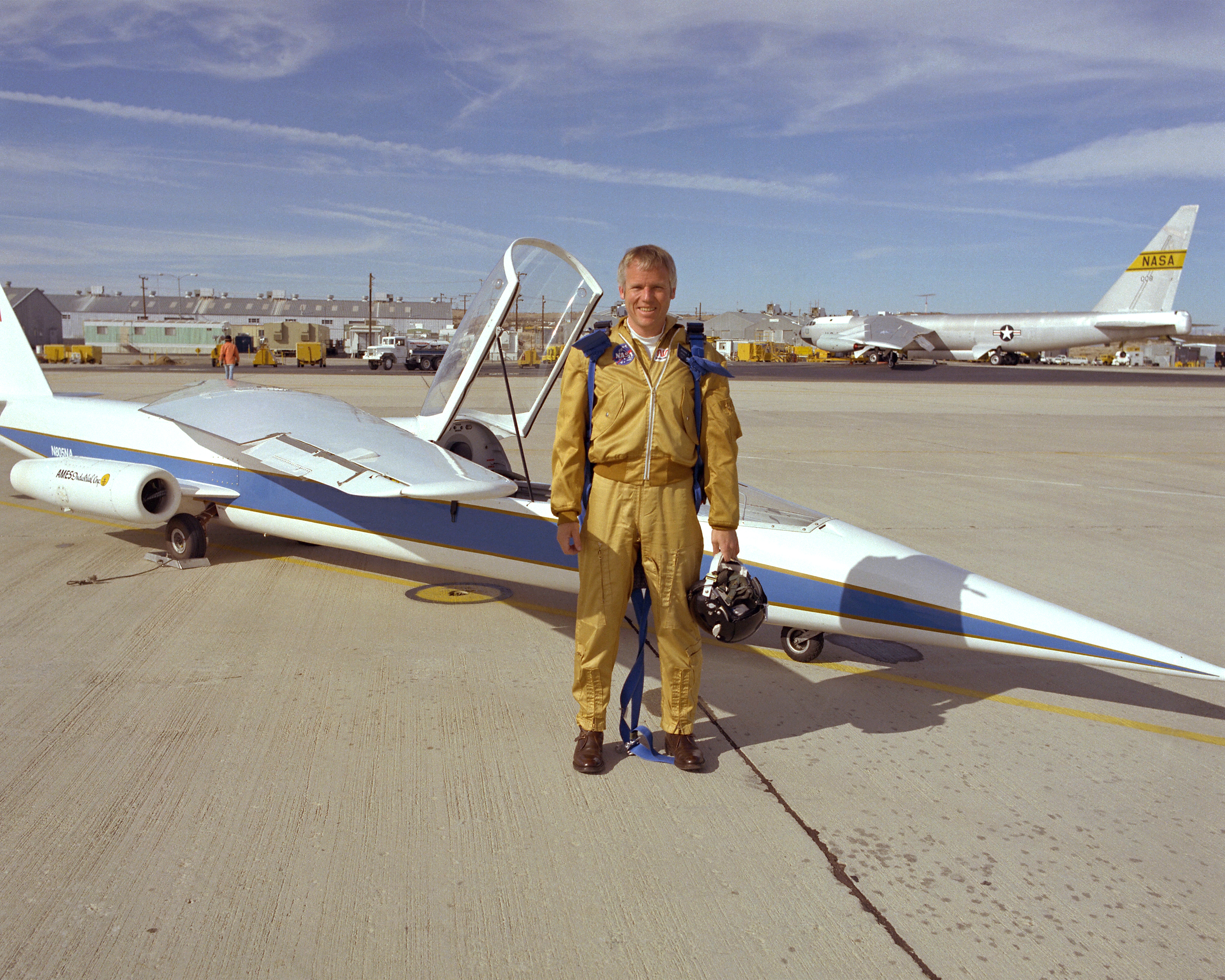
- Born: March 11, 1945; Newport News, Virginia, U.S.
- Died: November 8, 1982 (aged 37); Edwards, California, United States
- Occupation: Test pilot
- Parents: William Edwin Gray Jr.; Marian Ellen Caldwell

Richard Eben Gray (March 11, 1945 – November 8, 1982) was a Naval aviator for the United States Navy, and latterly a research test pilot. He was born in Newport News, Virginia. He graduated with a Bachelor of Science degree in aeronautical engineering from San Jose State University in 1969 on a scholarship from the Society of Experimental Test Pilots (SETP), of which his father, William E. Gray, had been a member. Gray himself became a member of SETP in the mid-1970s and served on the SETP Board of Directors as Southwest Section Technical Adviser in 1981/1982.

He joined the United States Navy in July 1969 and earned his wings in January 1971. He was assigned to fly F-4 Phantoms at Naval Air Station Miramar, and in 1972 he flew 48 combat missions in F-4s in Vietnam while assigned to VF-111 aboard the USS Coral Sea. After making a second cruise in 1973, Gray was assigned to Air Test and Evaluation Squadron Four (VX-4) at NAS Pt. Mugu, as a project pilot on various operational test and evaluation programs. He served as chief test director for the AIM-7F Sparrow in 1975–76 before being assigned as an F-14A project pilot on the Air Combat Evaluation/Intercept Missile Evaluation (ACEVAL/AIMVAL) program. He was also the chief test director for the operational test and evaluation of the television sight unit and the dual-seat visual-target-acquisition system in the F-14A. In 1978 he was assigned back to VF-111 at NAS Miramar as an F-14A pilot.

Later in 1978 he became an aerospace research pilot at NASA's Johnson Space Center in Houston, Texas. Whilst at the Johnson Space Center he was chief project pilot on the WB-57F high-altitude research project and served as the prime television chase pilot on the T-38 for the landing portion of the Space Shuttle orbital flight tests performed by the Space Shuttle Enterprise.

In November 1981 he became a research test pilot at NASA's Ames-Dryden Flight Research Facility (as Dryden Flight Research Center, Edwards, California, was called from 1981 to 1994). There, he was a pilot on the F-14 Aileron Rudder Interconnect project, the NASA AD-1 Oblique wing research aircraft, and the F-8 Digital Fly-By-Wire project. He also flew the F-104, T-37, and F-15 airplanes.

On November 8, 1982, he was fatally injured in a T-37B jet aircraft while making a proficiency flight, the aircraft crashing after entering a spin.
