= R. T. Jones =

R. T. Jones may refer to:

- Robert Taylor Jones (1884 – 1958), American politician, Governor of Arizona
- Robert Thomas Jones (engineer) (1910 – 1999), aerodynamicist and aeronautical engineer for NACA and later NASA
