= Scaled Composites ARES =

American demonstrator aircraft

ARES
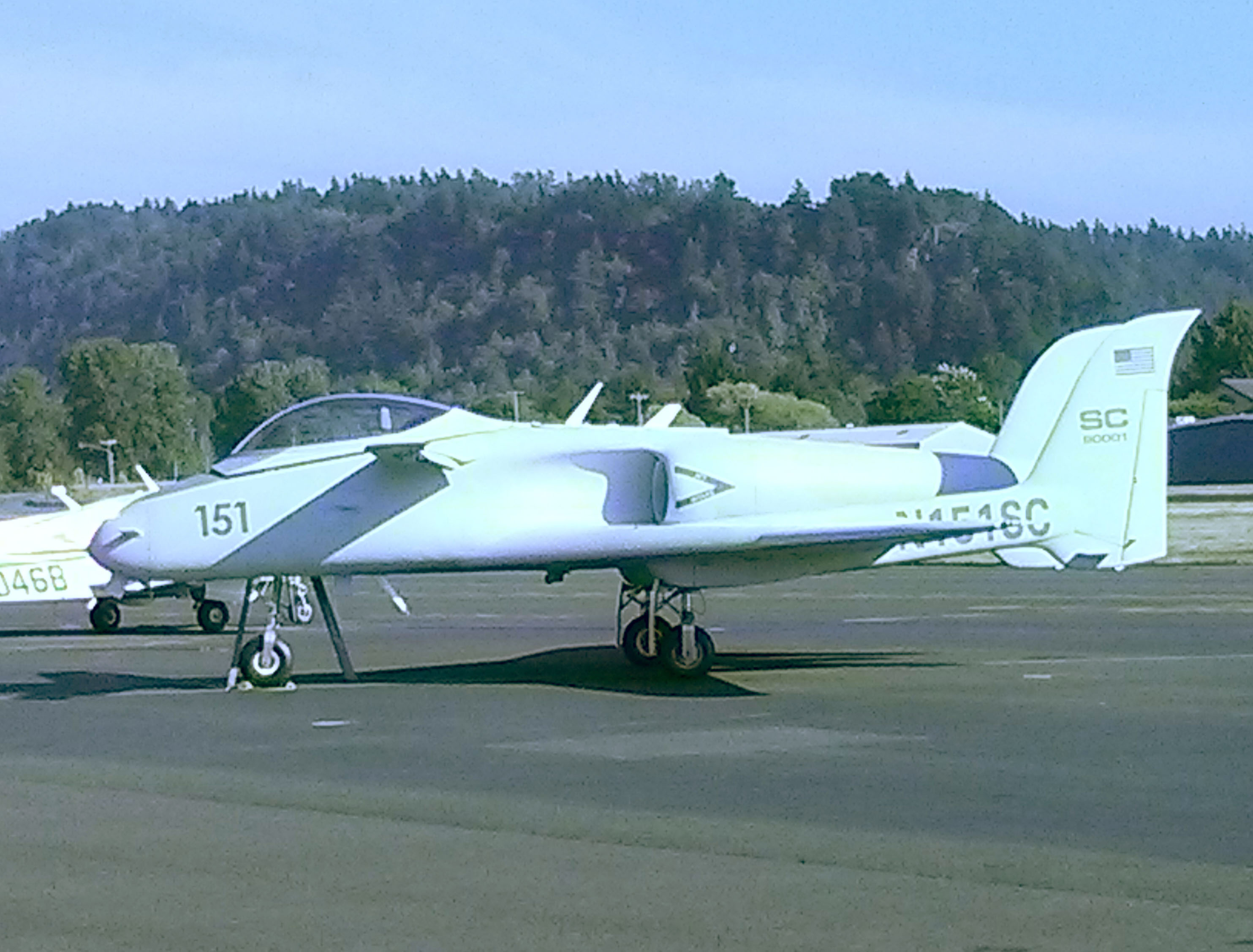

General information
- Type: Close air support aircraft concept demonstrator
- National origin: United States
- Manufacturer: Scaled Composites
- Designer: Burt Rutan
- Number built: 1

History
- First flight: 19 February 1990

The Scaled Composites ARES is a demonstrator aircraft built by Scaled Composites. ARES is an acronym for Agile Responsive Effective Support.

== Development ==
In 1981, U.S. Army Aviators Jim Kreutz and Milo Burroughs undertook a study for a low cost battlefield attack aircraft (LCBAA), as they felt the close air support aircraft available were inadequate to support the U.S. Army operations. They decided that a fixed-wing aircraft with excellent maneuvering capabilities at very low altitudes and resistance to stall would be necessary.

Burt Rutan joined their study to design an aircraft to meet the requirements with a two-phase program. The first phase was the preliminary design of LCBAA, while in the second phase the Long EZ aircraft was modified to serve as a technology demonstrator. The original layout was of a low wing canard configuration, aircraft powered by a pusher turboprop, and built around a 30 mm Gatling gun capable of destroying light armored vehicles. It was decided that as much military hardware as possible would be used in the design.

When a Pentagon official promised that they would evaluate his aircraft if he built it, he built a demonstrator aircraft in 1986.

By this time the aircraft had changed significantly. It retained the general configuration, but now had a single Pratt & Whitney Canada JT15D-5 turbofan engine rather than a turboprop as the propeller was vulnerable to debris kicked up by the nosewheel.

A GAU-12/U 25 mm rotary barreled cannon was mounted in the aircraft to the right of the nose in a concave recess under the cockpit. The concave recess trapped gun exhaust gases, creating a pressure buildup in the recess which pushing the aircraft's nose to the left, cancelled the recoil of the large cannon, which otherwise pushed the nose to the right. To prevent exhaust gases from the gun entering the engine intake and reducing engine performance, the engine intake was located on the left side of the nose, opposite the cannon making the aircraft asymmetric. Thrust was redirected to the centerline via a series of ducts, which also reduced the infrared signature.

After Beechcraft sold Scaled Composites back to Rutan, he chose to complete the project with company funds. This aircraft was renamed ARES, and first flew on February 19, 1990, piloted by Scaled Composites test pilot Doug Shane. Since then it has flown more than 250 hours, and met its original design specifications for performance and range. In 1991 under US Air Force contract, the ARES 25 mm cannon was installed and during testing the cannon performed well but the ARES remains a private project.

After an appearance in the movie Aces: Iron Eagle III as a fictional Me 263 fighter, the aircraft has become a commercially available research test bed. The aircraft was stored in December 2000 at the Mojave Spaceport until Scaled Composites became a Northrop Grumman subsidiary and flown again on March 7, 2008.

== Design ==
The ARES is of canard configuration to enable safer flight at low altitude. The foreplane provides pitch control and is designed so that it reaches critical angle of attack sooner than the main wings, protecting the aircraft from stall while full roll control is retained. The foreplane has a wingspan of 19.2 feet (5.85 m) and is unusual in being swept 7 degrees forward from its attachment point behind the cockpit.

The main wing has a span of 35 feet (11 m) and a reference area of 191 sq ft (17.7 m^{2}), not including the strakes. It is swept aft 16 degrees at the leading edge. The strakes are swept 49 degrees at the leading edge. These strakes, combined with a wet wing center-section area, form the bulk of the 2,200 pounds (1,000 kg), approximately 333 US gallons or 1,260 litres) fuel capacity. The wing has conventional ailerons on the outboard trailing edge, and spoil-flaps (similar to the dive-brake flap) on the inboard trailing edges. The ailerons are actuated by push-rods, and the spoil-flaps are hydraulically operated.

Directional stability is provided by twin boom-mounted fins, each of 18 sq ft (1.7 m^{2}). area. Each has a cable-actuated rudder at its trailing edge. The rudder actuation system also drives the full-time mechanical nosewheel steering for ground operations.

The engine inlet is another major unique feature of ARES. Since gun gas ingestion posed significant problems in other aircraft development programs (like A-10), the configuration of ARES was designed to avoid this problem: the engine inlet is entirely contained on the left side of the aircraft, and the gun is installed on the right side. The inlet has a circular cross section, and is straight into the fan face. The engine is mounted slightly transversely in the fuselage, with an 8-degree misalignment from the aircraft's longitudinal axis.

The engine exhaust is turned back to the longitudinal axis by a curved composite tailpipe. A composite tailpipe was to help get the gun recoil reaction closer to the aircraft lateral center of gravity (CG) location, the gun is sub-merged as deeply as practical into the right side of the fuselage. Also, the fuselage is not centered about the aircraft centerline, but is offset to the left by three inches (7.6 cm). This results in the firing barrel of the gun being only about 18 inches (46 cm) from the lateral CG. This minimizes the yaw movement caused by the recoil of the gun.

The aircraft fuselage is almost completely made of fiberglass composite material installed over the foam core. The fabrication technique of composite aircraft fuselages has been perfected by Scaled Composites in previous aircraft.

To assure a low cost and high reliability of the components ARES primarily includes off-the-shelf aircraft systems. The engine is the Pratt and Whitney Canada JT15D with 2,900 lb (13.2 kN) of thrust at sea level. The hydraulic system, used for spoiler flaps and landing gear actuation, uses a Piper Malibu hydraulic pump, which operates at 1,500 psi (10 MPa). Instrumentation for the demonstrator consists mainly of standard general aviation equipment. In addition there is a head-up display which currently displays only a fixed reticle to aim the gun but is capable of displaying the complete data range of an F-16. The pilot sits in a Universal Propulsion Company SIIIS-3ER ejection seat with zero-zero capability.

The fuel system consists of auxiliary wing tanks feeding an armored, fuselage-mounted main tank, which sits just forward of the engine and behind the firewall. The main tank can feed the engine in all attitudes. This tank is continuously refilled from the main wing tanks with no fuel management duties required of the pilot. By feeding the main tank from the two auxiliary wing tanks, the size of the fuel tank in the fuselage was effectively halved, creating a large space behind the pilot empty of any tanks or other aircraft systems. This bay had no dedicated function on the demonstrator, but was intended to be left available for any additional equipment which the Army might wish to install in the production version.

The main flight controls are completely mechanical and the engine has a backup mechanical fuel control so the aircraft can retain control even if the electrical system fails. The controls were specially designed to minimize the forces on the stick.

Besides the GAU-12 gun, there are additional pylons to carry another ordnance (Hydra 70 FFAR, for example).

The ARES has very good turning performance as a result of low wing loading. Its turn rate is 32 degrees per second at 6G and 36 degrees per second at 7G (the structure is limited to 8G). The corner speed is 210 kn (390 km/h) the stall speed is 78 kn (144 km/h).

Due to high fuel volume and good cruising efficiency the aircraft can have a range of 1,200 nautical miles (2,200 kilometres) at altitude and long endurance.

== Specifications (Scaled Composites 151 ARES) ==
Data from Jane's All The World's Aircraft 1993–1994

General characteristics

- Crew: 1
- Length: 29 ft 5.25 in (8.97 m)
- Wingspan: 35 ft 0 in (10.67 m)
- Height: 9 ft 10 in (3.00 m)
- Wing area: 188.3 sq ft (17.49 m^{2})
- Empty weight: 2,884 lb (1,308 kg)
- Gross weight: 4,804 lb (2,179 kg)
- Max takeoff weight: 6,100 lb (2,767 kg)
- Powerplant: 1 × Pratt & Whitney JT15D turbofan, 2,950 lbf (13.1 kN) thrust

Performance

- Maximum speed: 466 mph (750 km/h, 405 kn) (TAS) at 25,000 feet (7,600 m)
- Combat range: 690 mi (1,100 km, 600 nmi)
- Service ceiling: 35,000 ft (10,670 m)
- Thrust/weight: 0.43 (at maximum weight)

Armament

- 1× 25 mm GAU-12/U Gatling cannon
- AAMs: 2× AIM-9 Sidewinder or 4× AIM-92 Stinger
- Air-to-ground weapons include: unguided rockets

== See also ==
- Textron AirLand Scorpion
- IML Addax, similar project from New Zealand
- British Aerospace P.1233-1 Saba
- PZL-230 Skorpion
