= NASA AD-1 =

NASA experimental oblique wing aircraft

AD-1
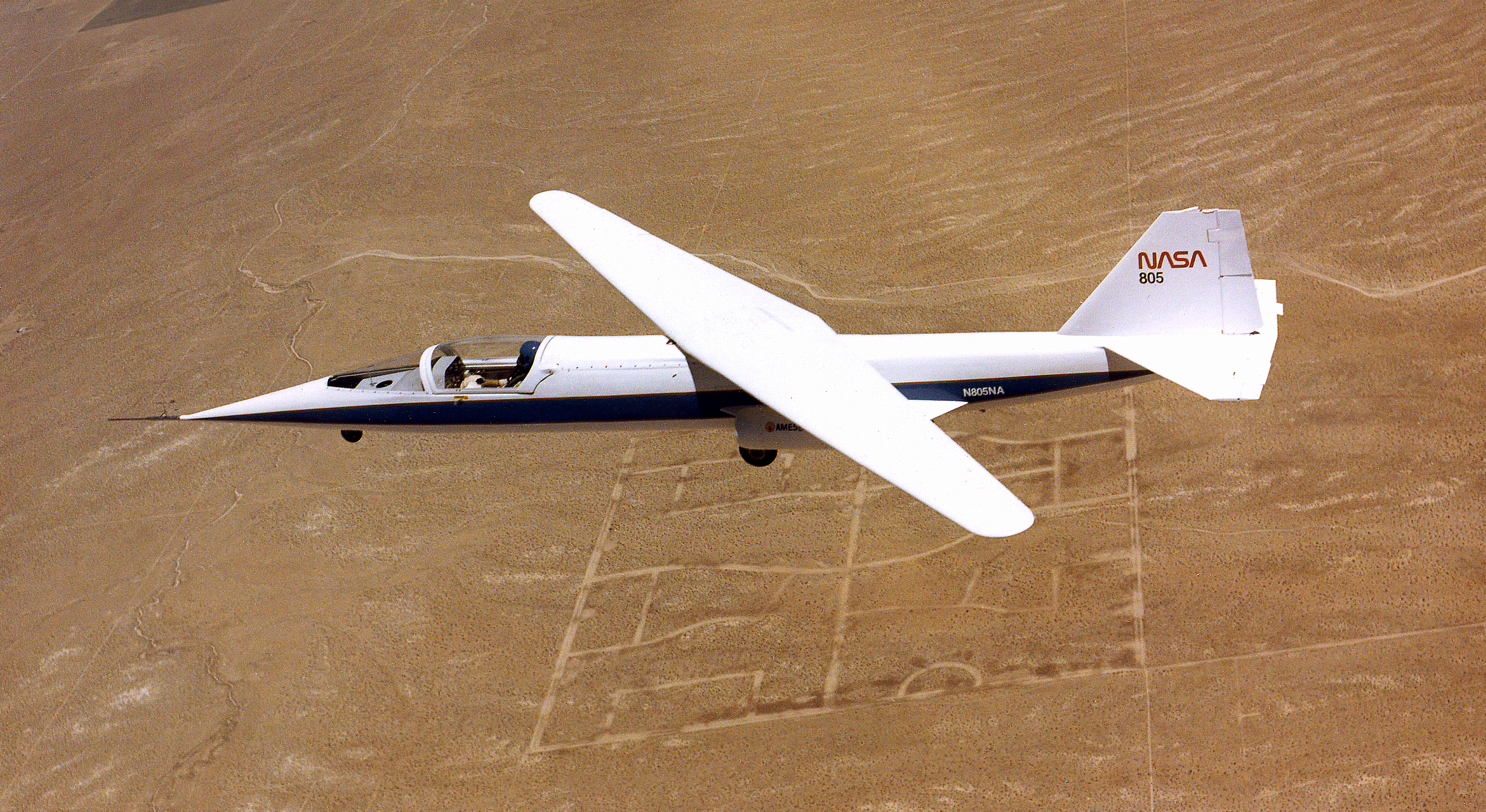
- The AD-1 with its wing at a moderate angle

General information
- Type: Experimental aircraft
- National origin: United States
- Manufacturer: Ames Industrial Co.
- Designer: Burt Rutan
- Primary user: NASA
- Number built: 1

History
- First flight: December 21, 1979
- Retired: August 1982

The NASA AD-1 is both an aircraft and an associated flight test program conducted between 1979 and 1982 at the NASA Dryden Flight Research Center, Edwards California, which successfully demonstrated an aircraft wing that could be pivoted obliquely from zero to 60 degrees during flight.

The unique oblique wing was demonstrated on a small, subsonic jet-powered research aircraft called the AD-1 (Ames-Dryden-1). The aircraft was flown 79 times during the research program, which evaluated the basic pivot-wing concept and gathered information on handling qualities and aerodynamics at various speeds and degrees of pivot.

== Project background ==
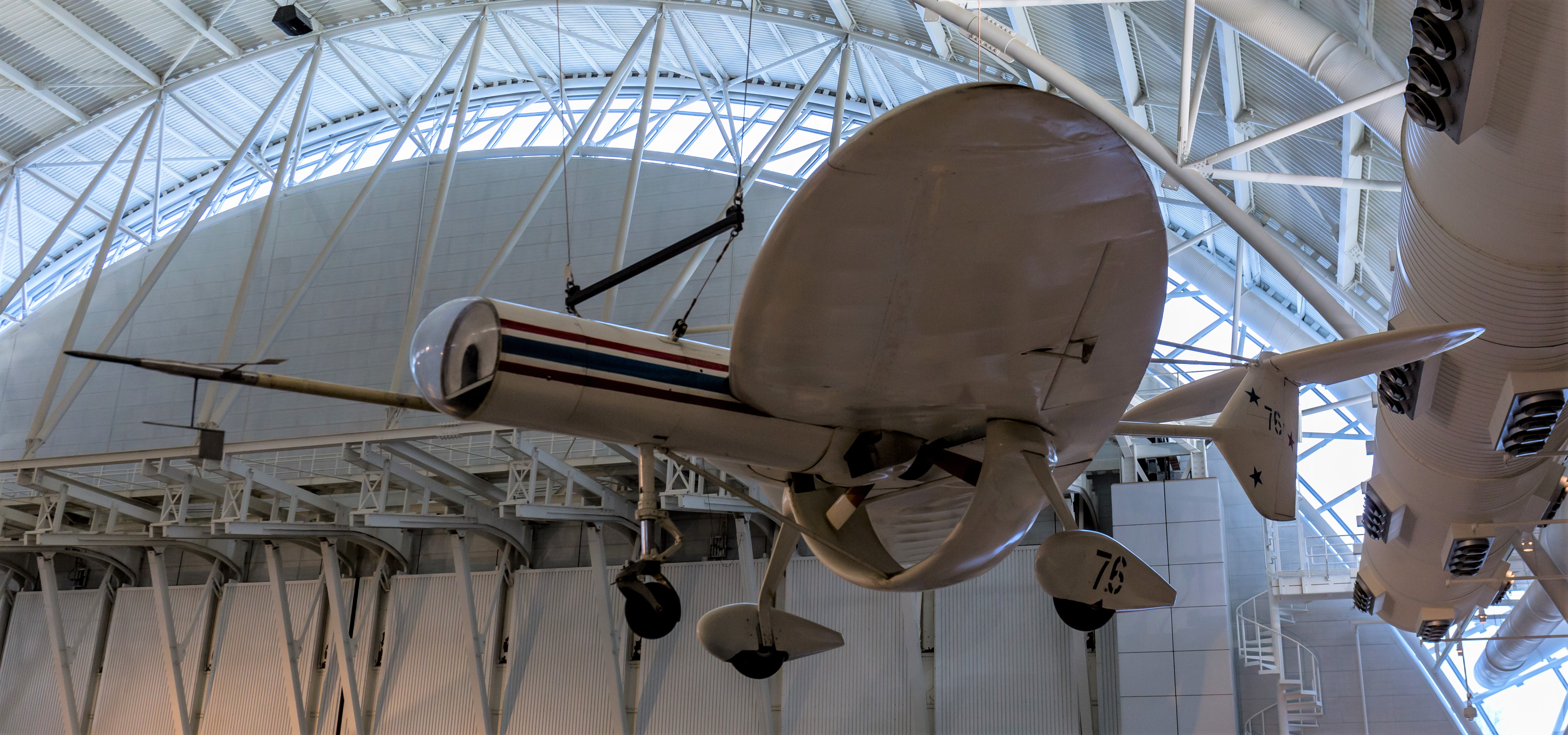
The NASA Oblique Wing Research Aircraft, the predecessor to the AD-1.

The first known oblique wing design was the Blohm & Voss P.202, proposed by Richard Vogt in 1942. The oblique wing concept was later promoted by Robert T. Jones, an aeronautical engineer at NASA's Ames Research Center, Moffett Field, California. Analytical and wind tunnel studies Jones initiated at Ames indicated that a transport-size oblique-wing aircraft, flying at speeds up to Mach 1.4, would have substantially better aerodynamic performance than aircraft with more conventional wings. At high speeds, both subsonic and supersonic, the wing would be pivoted at up to 60 degrees to the aircraft's fuselage for better high-speed performance. The studies showed these angles would decrease aerodynamic drag, permitting increased speed and longer range with the same fuel expenditure. At lower speeds, during takeoffs and landings, the wing would be perpendicular to the fuselage like a conventional wing to provide maximum lift and control qualities. As the aircraft gained speed, the wing would be pivoted to increase the oblique angle, thereby reducing the drag and decreasing fuel consumption. The wing could only be swept in one direction, with the right wingtip moving forward.

== Aircraft ==
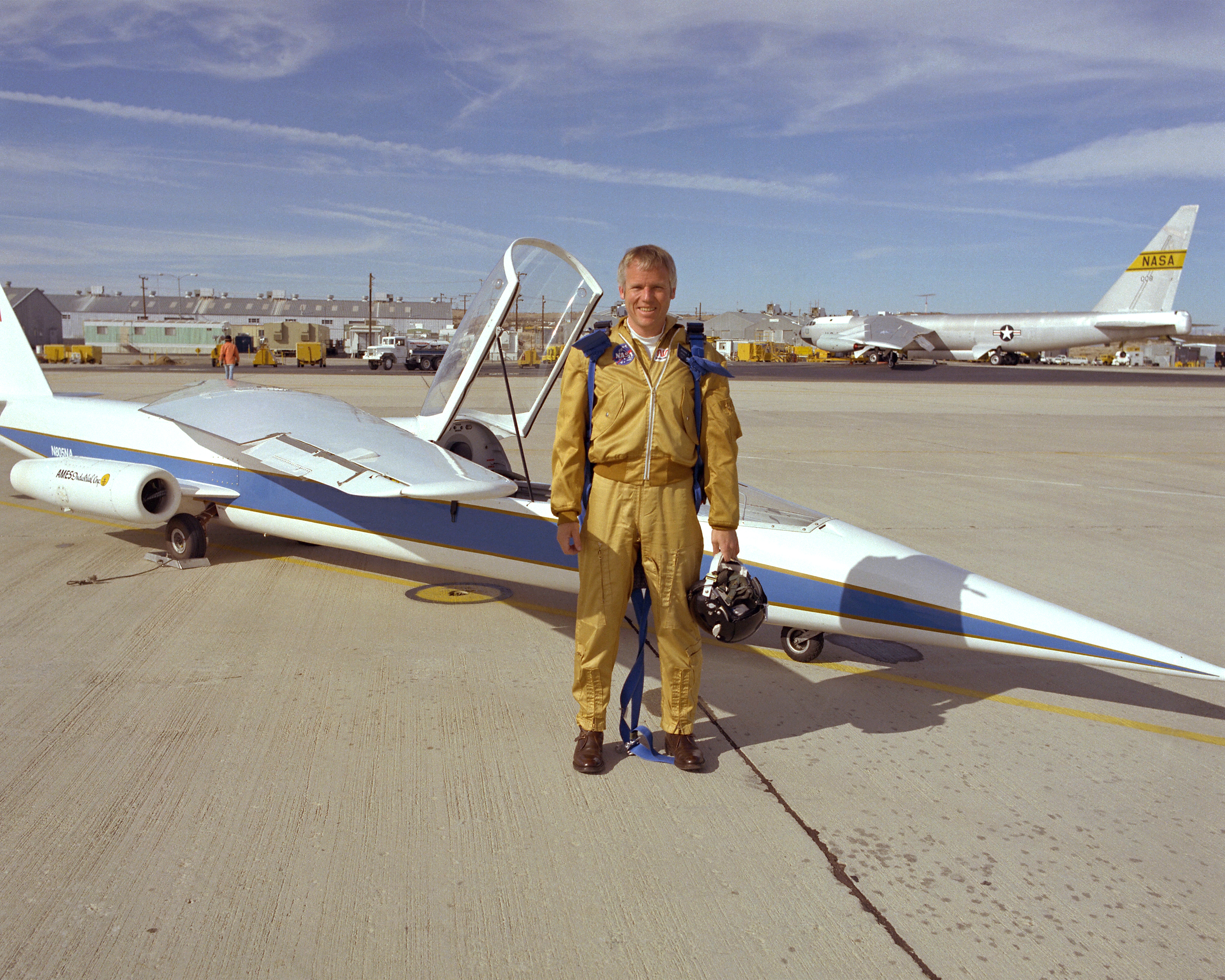
The AD-1 and pilot Richard E. Gray

The AD-1 aircraft was delivered to Dryden in February 1979. The Ames Industrial Co., Bohemia, New York, constructed it, under a US$240,000 fixed-price contract. NASA specified the overall vehicle design using a geometric configuration studied by Boeing Commercial Airplanes, Seattle, Washington. The Rutan Aircraft Factory, Mojave, California, provided the detailed design and load analysis for the intentionally low-speed, low-cost aircraft (there, the aircraft was known internally as the Model 35). The low speed and cost, of course, limited the complexity of the vehicle and the scope of its technical objectives.

Piloting the aircraft on its first flight December 21, 1979, was NASA research pilot Thomas C. McMurtry, who was also the pilot on the final flight August 7, 1982. Another well-known test pilot involved in the project was Pete Knight.

The AD-1 was powered by two small Microturbo TRS18-046 turbojet engines, each producing 220 pounds-force (0.98 kN) of static thrust at sea level. These were essentially the same engines used in the BD-5J. The aircraft was limited for reasons of safety to a speed of about 170 mph (270 km/h).

The AD-1 was 38.8 feet (11.8 m) in length and had a wingspan of 32.3 feet (9.8 m) unswept. It was constructed of plastic reinforced with fiberglass, in a sandwich with the skin separated by a rigid foam core. It had a gross weight of 2,145 pounds (973 kg), and an empty weight of 1,450 pounds (660 kg).

A fixed tricycle landing gear, mounted close to the fuselage to lessen aerodynamic drag, gave the aircraft a very "squatty" appearance on the ground. It was only 6.75 feet (2.06 m) high. The wing was pivoted by an electrically-driven gear mechanism located inside the fuselage, just forward of the engines.

== Flight research ==
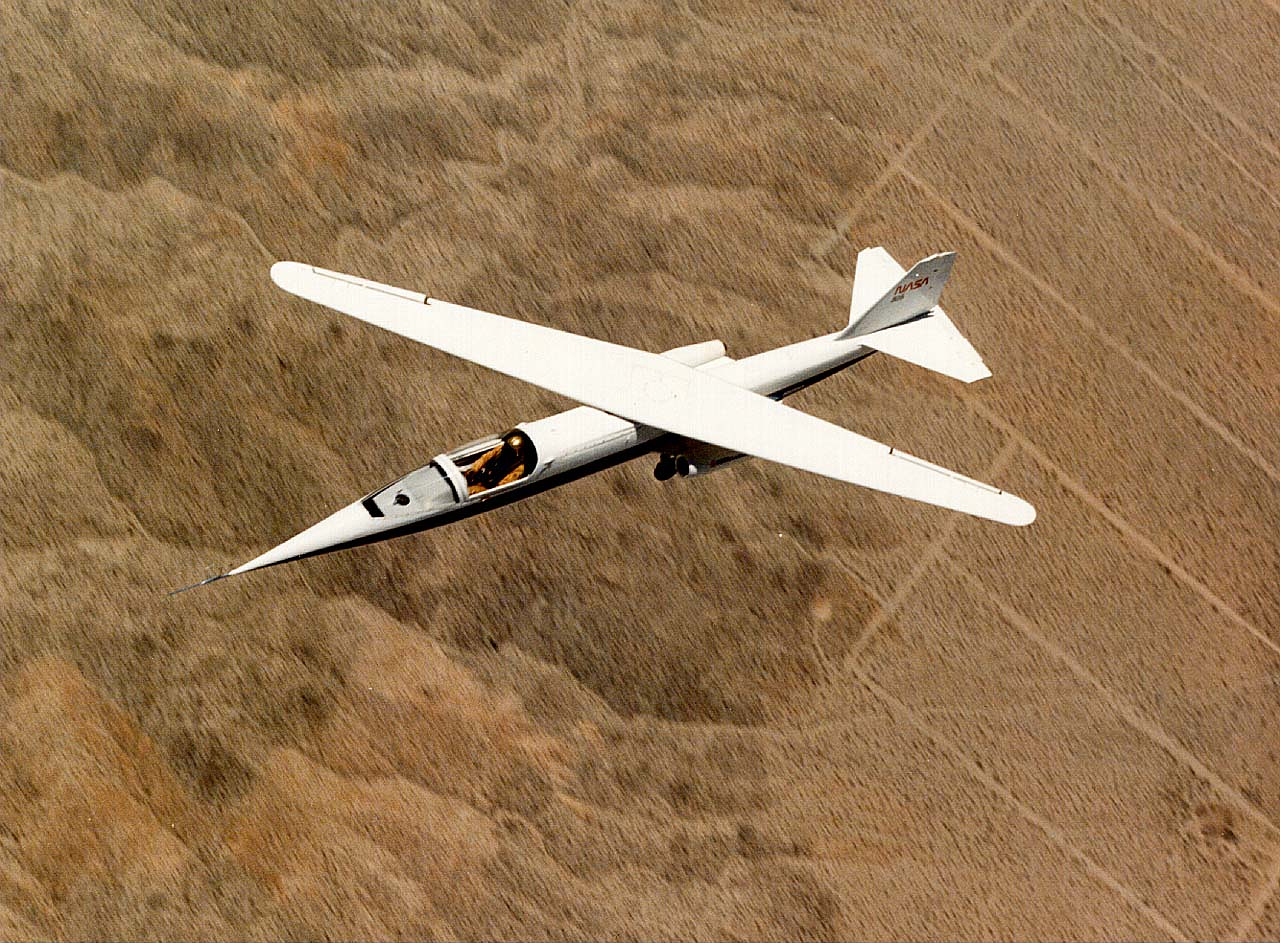
Overhead view

The research program to validate the oblique wing concept was typical of any NASA high-risk project — to advance through each test element and expand the operating envelope, methodically and carefully. The basic purpose of the AD-1 project was to investigate the low-speed characteristics of an oblique-wing configuration.

The AD-1 made its first flight late in 1979. The wing was pivoted incrementally over the next 18 months until the full 60-degree angle was reached in mid-1981. The aircraft continued to be flown for another year, obtaining data at various speeds and wing-pivot angles until the final flight in August 1982.

The final flight of the AD-1 did not occur at Dryden, however, but at the Experimental Aircraft Association's (EAA) annual exhibition at Oshkosh, Wisconsin, where it was flown eight times to demonstrate its unique configuration.

Following the flight research, Jones still considered the oblique wing as a viable lift concept for large transoceanic or transcontinental transports. This particular low-speed, low-cost research vehicle, however, exhibited aeroelastic and pitch-roll-coupling effects that contributed to poor handling qualities at sweep angles above 45 degrees. The fiberglass structure limited wing stiffness that would have improved the aircraft's handling qualities, as an improved (and thus more expensive) control system would also have done.

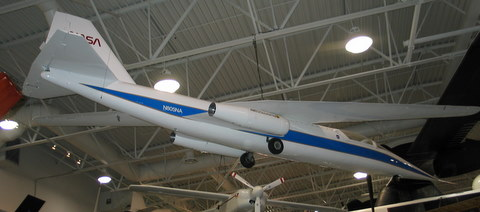
NASA AD-1 on display at the Hiller Aviation Museum

Thus, although the AD-1 structure allowed completion of the program's technical objectives, there was still a need for a transonic oblique-wing research aircraft to assess the effects of compressibility, evaluate a more representative structure, and analyze flight performance at transonic speeds (those on either side of the speed of sound).

After completion of the test program, the AD-1 was retired and is now on exhibit in the Hiller Aviation Museum in San Carlos, California.

== Specifications ==
Data from Linehan 2011

General characteristics

- Crew: 1 (pilot)
- Length: 38 ft 10 in (11.83 m)
- Wingspan: 32 ft 4 in (9.85 m) unswept
- Swept wingspan: 16 ft 2 in (4.93 m) swept 60° sweep angle
- Height: 6 ft 9 in (2.06 m)
- Wing area: 93 sq ft (8.6 m^{2})
- Airfoil: NACA 3612-02, 40
- Empty weight: 1,450 lb (658 kg)
- Gross weight: 2,145 lb (973 kg)
- Fuel capacity: 80 US gallons (300 L)
- Powerplant: 2 × Microturbo TRS 18 turbojets, 220 lbf (0.98 kN) thrust each

Performance

- Maximum speed: 200 mph (320 km/h, 170 kn)
- Service ceiling: 12,000 ft (3,700 m)

== See also ==
- Asymmetrical aircraft

Aircraft of comparable role, configuration, and era

- Northrop Grumman Switchblade
- DSI/NASA Oblique Wing RPV

Related lists

- List of NASA aircraft
- List of experimental aircraft
