= NAS Award in Aeronautical Engineering =

The NAS Award in Aeronautical Engineering, also known as the J.C. Hunsaker Award in Aeronautical Engineering, is awarded by the U.S. National Academy of Sciences for "excellence in the field of aeronautical engineering". Established by Jerome C. Hunsaker and his wife, it was first awarded in 1968.

== List of NAS Award in Aeronautical Engineering winners ==
Source: National Academy of Sciences

- Alan C. Brown (2020)

For innovative contributions to the design of commercial and military aircraft, and particularly leadership of the team that developed the F-117 Stealth Fighter.

- Alan R. Mulally (2015)

For his distinguished leadership in commercial aviation as exemplified by the development and commercialization of the Boeing 777

- Norman R. Augustine (2010)

For his service to the nation as a dedicated aeronautical engineer, a leader in the aerospace defense industry, a public servant, a civic leader, and a thought leader in the engineering profession.

- Elbert L. Rutan (2005)

For leadership in engineering design and construction of SpaceShipOne, Voyager, and other successful experimental aircraft.

- Richard T. Whitcomb (2000)

For his pioneering contributions to the aerodynamic design of high performance aircraft.

- William R. Sears (1995)

For his significant and enduring contributions to education, aerodynamics, and aircraft design, including the optimal Sears-Haack body and the original Northrop flying wing.

- Robert T. Jones (1990)

For his major contributions to aeronautics, including his supersonic area rule, discovery of the value of wing sweep in attaining supersonic flight, and application of the Heaviside Calculus to flight dynamics.

- Thornton A. Wilson (1985)

For his bold and farsighted leadership, He gave the nation the ability to maintain and enhance its superiority in commercial aircraft.

- James S. McDonnell (1980)

For his distinguished and pioneering contributions in engineering design and development of advanced military and commercial aircraft.

- Donald Wills Douglas, Sr. (1973)

For his vast contribution to the aviation world.

- Leroy Randle Grumman (1968)

For his long continued contributions to aeronautical engineering.

== See also ==
- List of engineering awards
