= Robert Thomas Jones (engineer) =

American engineer

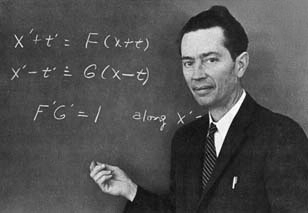
- Born: May 28, 1910
- Died: August 11, 1999; Los Altos Hills
- Occupations: Military flight engineer, engineer, aerospace engineer
- Employer: NASA
- Awards: Ludwig Prandtl Ring (1978); Langley Gold Medal (1981); Fluid Dynamics Prize (APS) (1986); NAS Award in Aeronautical Engineering (For his major contributions to aeronautics, including his supersonic area rule, discovery of the value of wing sweep in attaining supersonic flight, and application of the Heaviside Calculus to flight dynamics., 1990)

Robert T. Jones, (May 28, 1910 – August 11, 1999), was an American aerodynamicist and aeronautical engineer for NACA and later NASA. He was known at NASA as "one of the premier aeronautical engineers of the twentieth century".

== Early experience ==
Jones grew up in the American Midwest farming community of Macon, Missouri. Fascinated by airplanes, he attended Macon High School, built model airplanes from kits and scale drawings, and read aviation magazines and National Advisory Committee for Aeronautics (NACA) technical reports. He attended the University of Missouri for one year, but dropped out to join the Marie Meyer Flying Circus. There he took flying lessons in return for doing engineering maintenance, as he described it, "carrying gas and patching wing tips".

In 1929, engineer Walter Barling left the Nicholas-Beazley Airplane Company. Stunt-pilot Charley Fower recommended Jones to the company as someone who “knew everything there was to know about airplanes.” Until the company added English engineer Thomas Kirkup to the team, Jones was their sole engineer. From Kirkup, Jones learned about airplane design and stress analysis. Jones developed the Pobjoy Special air racer, but because of the depression the company was forced to shut down.

With the help of his local congressman, Jones found work as an elevator operator in the House Office Building in Washington, D.C. He spent his spare time studying at the Library of Congress, where he met Albert Francis Zahm, chief of the Aeronautical Division of the U.S. Library. At Zahm's recommendation, Jones tutored Maryland congressman David John Lewis (also self-educated) in mathematics. Jones also met Max Munk, who encouraged him to take a graduate-level course in aerodynamics that Munk taught in the evening at Catholic University.

== Research ==
In 1934, President Roosevelt's public works program offered short-term positions for scientific aides at NACA's Langley Research Center in Hampton, Virginia. Jones obtained one of the positions, with recommendations from Zahm, Munk, and Lewis. At the end of the first nine month position, he was rehired through temporary reappointments. A permanent appointment at the initial civil-service level for an Engineer seemed impossible because it required a Bachelor's degree. However, the next higher professional grade did not state that requirement. In 1936 Jones was promoted directly to second level engineer.

In January 1945, Jones developed a theory of the delta wing based on thin-airfoil theory. Others at Langley were sceptical until supersonic testing of models was done by Robert Gilruth and in April by Theodore von Karman. Jones's theory was not truly accepted until that summer when Von Karman's team of investigators found that German experts had been working on swept-wing designs for several years. Jones's thin-wing design ultimately proved superior to thick airfoils developed by Alexander Lippisch in Germany.

In 1946 Jones was given the IAS Sylvanus Albert Reed Award, and transferred to Ames. The genius of Bob Jones seemed, in part, to lie in his remarkable ability to extract the essence of a problem and express it in understandable and useful terms. His approach to problems was always of a fundamental character and often yielded results of broad significance. In addition, Jones's wife Doris, an accomplished mathematician, also joined the Ames staff.

Later, still at Ames, Jones promoted the oblique wing. (The first known oblique wing design was the Blohm & Voss P.202, proposed by Richard Vogt in 1942.) Jones's wind tunnel studies indicated that such a wing design on a supersonic transport might achieve twice the fuel economy of an aircraft with conventional wings. The concept was flight tested successfully on the NASA AD-1. This unique aircraft had a wing which pivoted about the fuselage, remaining perpendicular to it during slow flight and rotating to angles up to 60 degrees as aircraft speed increased. Analytical and wind tunnel studies by Jones indicated that a transport-sized oblique-wing aircraft flying at speeds up to Mach 1.4 (1.4 times the speed of sound) would have substantially better aerodynamic performance than an aircraft with conventional wings at the same speed. A later DARPA project using a variable sweep oblique wing was the Switchblade.

Jones spent much of his time at Langley working in the Stability Research Division which pioneered many concepts that were incorporated into U.S. aircraft. As a self-trained aerodynamicist and mathematician, Jones built up a national reputation through his perceptive and original work at Langley and Ames.

== Awards ==
- 1946 Sylvanus Albert Reed Award (Institute of the Aeronautical Sciences)
- 1955 Fellow, American Institute of Aeronautics and Astronautics
- 1971 Honorary PhD-Science, University of Colorado
- 1973 Fellow, American Academy of Arts and Sciences
- 1973 Member, National Academy of Engineering
- 1975 W. Rupert Turnbull Lecture, Canadian Aeronautics and Space Institute
- 1978 Ludwig-Prandtl-Ring, Deutsche Gesellschaft fur Luft- und Raumfahrt
- 1979 Honorary Fellow, American Institute of Aeronautics and Astronautics
- 1981 Langley Gold Medal, Smithsonian Institution
- 1981 National Academy of Sciences
- 1981 President's Award for Distinguished Federal Civilian Service
- 1986 Fluid Dynamics Prize, (American Physical Society)
- 1990 NAS Award in Aeronautical Engineering from the National Academy of Sciences
- 1998 NASA Superstars of Modern Aeronautics

== Bibliography ==
- Properties of Low-Aspect-Ratio Pointed Wings at Speeds Below and Above the Speed of Sound. NACA Report Nº 835, 1946
- The Minimum Drag of Thin Wings in Frictionless Flow, Journal of the Aeronautical Sciences, Feb. 1951
- Theoretical Determination of the Minimum Drag of Airfoils at Supersonic Speeds, Journal of the Aeronautical Sciences, Dec. 1952
- Possibilities of Efficient High Speed Transport Airplanes, Proceedings of the Conference on High-Speed Aeronautics, Polytechnic Institute of Brooklyn, Jan. 1955
- Aerodynamic Design for Supersonic Speed, Advances in Aeronautical Sciences, Vol.1, Pergammon Press, 1959
- With Cohen, D., High Speed Wing Theory, Princeton University Press, 1960
- New Design Goals and a New Shape for the SST, Astronautics and Aeronautics, Dec. 1972
- With Graham, A., and Boltz, F., An Experimental Investigation of an Oblique Wing and Body Combination at Mach Numbers Between .6 and 1.4, NASA TM X-62207, Dec. 1972
- With Graham, A., and Boltz, F., An Experimental Investigation of Three Oblique Wing and Body Combinations at Mach Numbers Between .6 and 1.4, NASA TM X-62256, April 1973
- With Graham, A., and Summers, J., Wind Tunnel Test of an F-8 Airplane Model Equipped with an Oblique Wing, NASA TM X-62273, June 1973
- With Nisbet, J., Transonic Transport Wings -- Oblique or Swept? Astronautics and Aeronautics, Jan. 1974
- With Smith, R., and Summers, J., Transonic Wind Tunnel Tests of an F-8 Airplane Model Equipped with 12 and 14-percent Thick Oblique Wings, NASA TM X-62478, Oct. 1975
- With Smith, R., and Summers, J., Transonic Longitudinal and Lateral Control Characteristics of an F-8 Airplane Model Equipped with an Oblique Wing, NASA TM X-73103, March 1976
- The Oblique Wing — Aircraft Design for Transonic and Low Supersonic Speeds, Acta Astronautica, Vol. 4, Pergammon Press, 1977
- With Nisbet, J., Aeroelastic Stability and Control of an Oblique Wing, The Aeronautical Journal of the Royal Aeronautical Society, Aug. 1986
- The Flying Wing Supersonic Transport, Aeronautical Journal, March 1991.
- Wing Theory, Princeton University Press, 1990.
