= Blohm & Voss P 178 =

Type of aircraft

General information
- Type: Dive bomber/Fighter-bomber
- Manufacturer: Blohm & Voss
- Designer: Richard Vogt
- Status: Design project

The Blohm & Voss P 178 was a German jet-powered dive bomber/fighter-bomber of unusual asymmetric form, proposed during World War II.

== Overview ==
This asymmetrically-designed dive bomber had one Junkers Jumo 004B turbojet located under the wing to the starboard side of the fuselage. The pilot sat in a cockpit in the forward fuselage, with a large fuel tank located to the rear of the cockpit. Beneath the fuel tank, there was a deep recess in which an SC 500 bomb could be carried within the fuselage, or an SC 1000 bomb which would protrude slightly out of the fuselage. Two solid-fuel auxiliary rockets extended from the rear, used for take-off. Two 15 mm (.60 in) MG 151 cannons were located in the nose.

== Specifications ==
Data from Masters (1982). except where noted.

General characteristics

- Crew: 1
- Wingspan: 12.0 m (39 ft 4 in)
- Powerplant: 1 × Junkers Jumo 004B turbojet, 8.8 kN (2,000 lbf) thrust (900 kg static thrust)
- Powerplant: 2 × (unknown make) rockets

Armament

- Guns: 2 × 15 mm MG 151/15 machine guns
- Bombs: 1 × 500 kg or 1 x 1,000 kg

== See also ==
- List of German aircraft projects, 1939–45
