= British Aerospace P.1233-1 Saba =

Type of aircraft

The British Aerospace P.1233-1 Saba (Small Agile Battlefield Aircraft) was a project of a British anti-helicopter and close air support attack aircraft, designed by British Aerospace.

== Specifications ==
Data from Flight International, 5 December 1987, page 9

General characteristics

- Length: 9.5 m (31 ft 2 in)
- Wingspan: 10.97 m (36 ft 0 in)
- Wing area: 20.39 m^{2} (219.5 sq ft)
- Empty weight: 4,535 kg (9,998 lb)
- Max takeoff weight: 4,989 kg (10,999 lb)
- Powerplant: 1 × Lycoming T55-based propfan, 3,357 kW (4,502 hp)

Performance

- Maximum speed: 740 km/h (460 mph, 400 kn)
- Wing loading: 242 kg/m^{2} (50 lb/sq ft)
- Takeoff distance: 300 m (1,000 ft)

Armament

- Six AIM-132 advanced short-range air-to-air missiles
- Internal 25 mm (0.98 in) cannon with 150 rounds

== See also ==
- PZL-230 Skorpion
- Scaled Composites ARES
