= V speeds =

Standard terms to define airspeeds

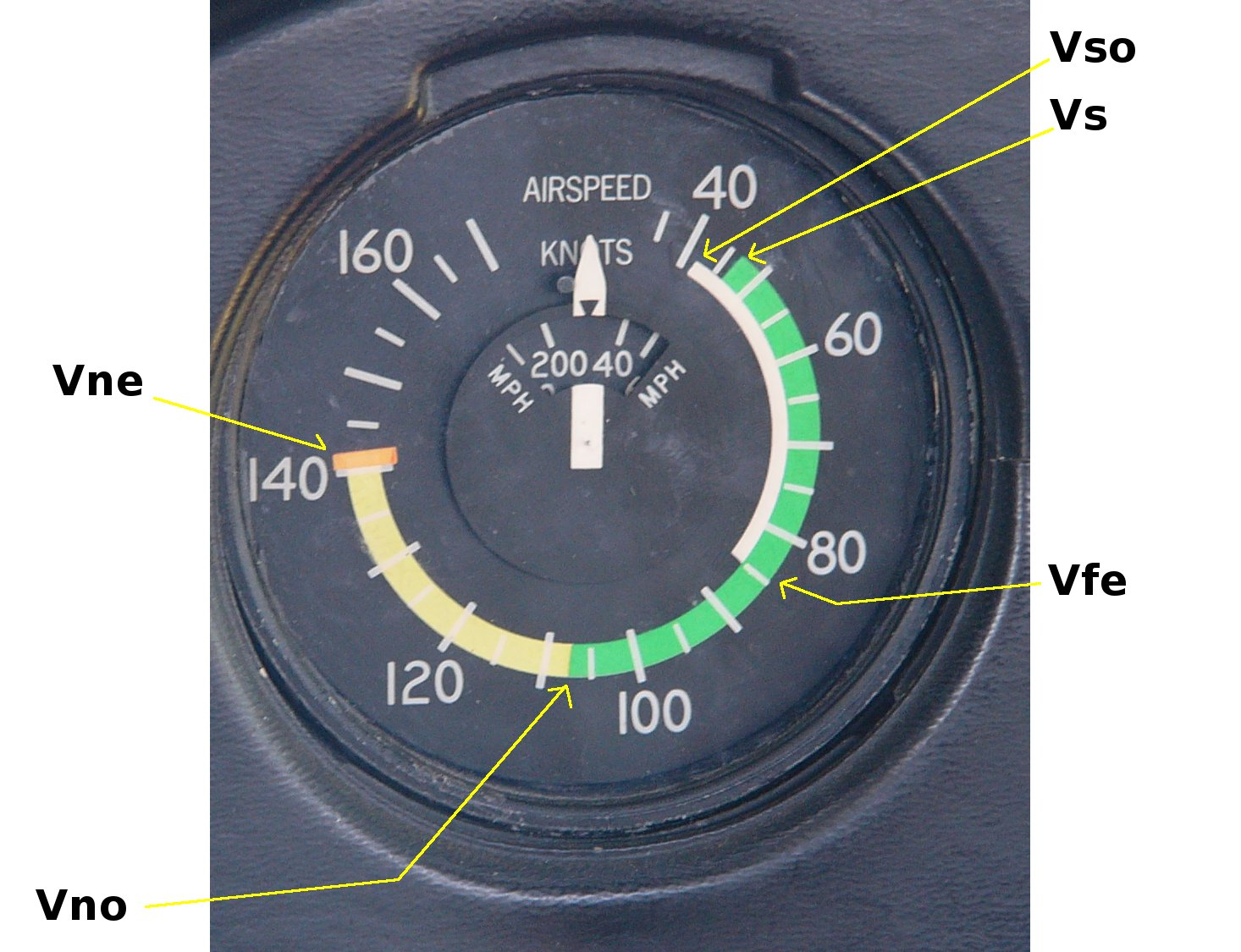
A single-engined Cessna 150L's airspeed indicator indicating its V-speeds in knots

In aviation, V-speeds are standard terms used to define airspeeds important or useful to the operation of all aircraft. These speeds are derived from data obtained by aircraft designers and manufacturers during flight testing for aircraft type-certification. Using them is considered a best practice to maximize aviation safety by adhering to that particular aircraft model’s critical performance characteristics.

The actual speeds represented by these designators are specific to a particular model of aircraft or, if the aircraft has been modified such that its critical speeds have changed, that exact aircraft (the new V-speeds may be placarded beside the airspeed indicator (ASI) [needs reference]). They are expressed by the aircraft's indicated airspeed (and not by, for example, the ground speed), so that pilots may use them directly, without having to apply correction factors, as aircraft instruments also show indicated airspeed.

In general aviation aircraft, the most commonly used and most safety-critical airspeeds are displayed as color-coded arcs and lines located on the face of an aircraft's airspeed indicator. The lower ends of the white arc and the green arc are the stalling speed with wing flaps in landing configuration, V_{SO}, and stalling speed with wing flaps retracted in cruise configuration, V_{S}, respectively. These are the stalling speeds for the aircraft at its maximum weight.

The high end of the green arc marks the end of the normal operating range, V_{NO}, followed by the yellow band, which is the range in which the aircraft may continue to be safely operated, but only in smooth air, and then only with caution to avoid abrupt control movement. The red line is the never-exceed speed, V_{NE.}

Additionally, the white arc represents the range of air speeds in which flaps may be extended. The high end of the arc, V_{FE}, is the maximum safe speed for operating the aircraft with the flaps extended.

Proper display of V-speeds is an airworthiness requirement for type-certificated aircraft in most countries.

== Regulations ==
The most common V-speeds are often defined by a particular government's aviation regulations. In the United States, these are defined in title 14 of the United States Code of Federal Regulations, known as the Federal Aviation Regulations (FARs). In Canada, the regulatory body, Transport Canada, defines 26 commonly used V-speeds in their Aeronautical Information Manual. V-speed definitions in FAR 23, 25 and equivalent are for designing and certification of airplanes, not for their operational use. The descriptions below are for use by pilots.

== Regulatory V-speeds ==
These V-speeds are defined by regulations. They are typically defined with constraints such as weight, configuration, or phases of flight. Some of these constraints have been omitted to simplify the description.

V-speed designator	Description
V_{1}	The speed beyond which takeoff should no longer be aborted (or "the point of no return") (see § V_{1} definitions below).
V_{2}	Takeoff safety speed. The speed at which the aircraft may safely climb with one engine inoperative.
V_{2_{min}}	Minimum takeoff safety speed.
V_{3}	Flap retraction speed.
V_{4}	Steady initial climb speed. The all engines operating take-off climb speed used to the point where acceleration to flap retraction speed is initiated. Should be attained by a gross height of 400 ft (120 m).
V_{A}	Design maneuvering speed. This is the speed above which it is unwise to make full application of any single flight control (or "pull to the stops") as it may generate a force greater than the aircraft's structural limitations.
V_{at}	Indicated airspeed at threshold, which is usually equal to the stall speed V_{S0} multiplied by 1.3 or stall speed V_{S1g} multiplied by 1.23 in the landing configuration at the maximum certificated landing mass, though some manufacturers apply different criteria. If both V_{S0} and V_{S1g} are available, the higher resulting V_{at} shall be applied. Also called "approach speed". Also known as V_{th} Davies defines V_{at} and V_{ref} as equivalent.
V_{B}	Design speed for maximum gust intensity.
V_{C}	Design cruise, also known as the optimum cruise speed, is the most efficient speed in terms of distance, speed and fuel usage.
V_{cef}	See V_{1}; generally used in documentation of military aircraft performance. Denotes "critical engine failure" speed as the speed during takeoff where the same distance would be required to either continue the takeoff or abort to a stop.
V_{D}	Design diving speed, the highest speed planned to be achieved in testing.
V_{DF}	Demonstrated flight diving speed, the highest actual speed achieved in testing.
V_{EF}	The speed at which the critical engine is assumed to fail during takeoff.
V_{F}	Designed flap speed.
V_{FC}	Maximum speed for stability characteristics.
V_{FE}	Maximum flap extended speed.
V_{FTO}	Final takeoff speed.
V_{H}	Maximum speed in level flight at maximum continuous power.
V_{LE}	Maximum landing gear extended speed. This is the maximum speed at which a retractable gear aircraft should be flown with the landing gear extended.
V_{LO}	Maximum landing gear operating speed. This is the maximum speed at which the landing gear on a retractable gear aircraft should be extended or retracted.
V_{LOF}	Lift-off speed.
V_{MC}	Minimum control speed. The minimum speed at which the aircraft is still controllable with the critical engine inoperative. Like the stall speed, there are several important variables that are used in this determination. Refer to the minimum control speed article for a thorough explanation. V_{MC} is sometimes further refined into more discrete V-speeds e.g. V_{MCA},V_{MCG}.
V_{MCA}	Minimum control speed air. The minimum speed that the aircraft is still controllable with the critical engine inoperative while the aircraft is airborne. V_{MCA} is sometimes simply referred to as V_{MC}.
V_{MCG}	Minimum control speed ground. The minimum speed that the aircraft is still controllable with the critical engine inoperative while the aircraft is on the ground.
V_{MCL}	Minimum control speed in the landing configuration with one engine inoperative.
V_{MO}	Maximum operating limit speed. Exceeding V_{MO} may trigger an overspeed alarm.
V_{MU}	Minimum unstick speed.
V_{NE}	Never exceed speed. In a helicopter, this is chosen to prevent retreating blade stall and prevent the advancing blade from going supersonic.
V_{NO}	Maximum structural cruising speed or maximum speed for normal operations. Speed at which exceeding the limit load factor may cause permanent deformation of the aircraft structure.
V_{O}	Maximum operating maneuvering speed.
V_{R}	Rotation speed. The speed at which the pilot begins to apply control inputs to cause the aircraft nose to pitch up, after which it will leave the ground. (Note: Most pilots often call out "rotate," instead of V_{R}. The "rotate" callout has the same meaning of V_{R} and V_{rot}.)
V_{rot}	Used instead of V_{R} (in discussions of the takeoff performance of military aircraft) to denote rotation speed in conjunction with the term V_{ref} (refusal speed).
V_{Ref}	Landing reference speed or threshold crossing speed. Must be at least 1.3 V_{S_{0}}. Must be at least V_{MC} for reciprocating-engine aircraft, or 1.05 V_{MC} for commuter category aircraft. In discussions of the takeoff performance of military aircraft, the term V_{ref} stands for refusal speed. Refusal speed is the maximum speed during takeoff from which the air vehicle can stop within the available remaining runway length for a specified altitude, weight, and configuration. Incorrectly, or as an abbreviation, some documentation refers to V_{ref} and/or V_{rot} speeds as "V_{r}."
V_{S}	Stall speed or minimum steady flight speed for which the aircraft is still controllable in cruise configuration.
V_{S_{0}}	Stall speed or minimum flight speed in landing configuration.
V_{S_{1}}	Stall speed or minimum steady flight speed for which the aircraft is still controllable in a specific configuration.
V_{S_{R}}	Reference stall speed.
V_{S_{R_{0}}}	Reference stall speed in landing configuration.
V_{S_{R_{1}}}	Reference stall speed in a specific configuration.
V_{SW}	Speed at which the stall warning will occur.
V_{TOSS}	Category A rotorcraft takeoff safety speed.
V_{X}	Speed that will allow for best angle of climb.
V_{Y}	Speed that will allow for the best rate of climb.

== Other V-speeds ==
Some of these V-speeds are specific to particular types of aircraft and are not defined by regulations.

V-speed designator	Description
V_{APP}	Approach speed. Speed used during final approach with landing flap set. V_{REF} plus safety increment, typically minimum 5 knots, and maximum 15 knots to avoid exceeding flap limiting speeds. Typically it is calculated as half the headwind component plus the gust factor. The purpose is to ensure that turbulence or gusts will not result in the airplane flying below V_{REF} at any point on the approach. Also known as V_{FLY}.
V_{BE}	Best endurance speed – the speed that gives the greatest airborne time for fuel consumed.
V_{BG}	Best power-off glide speed – the speed that provides maximum lift-to-drag ratio and thus the greatest gliding distance available.
V_{BR}	Best range speed – the speed that gives the greatest range for fuel consumed – often identical to V_{md}.
V_{FS}	Final segment of a departure with one powerplant failed.
V_{imd}	Minimum drag
V_{imp}	Minimum power
V_{LLO}	Maximum landing light operating speed – for aircraft with retractable landing lights.
V_{LS}	Lowest selectable speed
V_{mbe}	Maximum brake energy speed
V_{md}	Minimum drag (per lift) – often identical to V_{BE}. (alternatively same as V_{imd})
V_{min}	Minimum speed for instrument flight (IFR) for helicopters
V_{mp}	Minimum power
V_{ms}	Minimum sink speed at median wing loading – the speed at which the minimum descent rate is obtained. In modern gliders, V_{ms} and V_{mc} have evolved to the same value.
V_{p}	Aquaplaning speed
V_{PD}	Maximum speed at which whole-aircraft parachute deployment has been demonstrated
V_{ra}	Rough air speed (turbulence penetration speed).
V_{SL}	Stall speed in a specific configuration
V_{s_{1g}}	Stall speed at 1g load factor
V_{sse}	Safe single-engine speed
V_{t}	Threshold speed
V_{TD}	Touchdown speed
V_{TGT}	Target speed
V_{TO}	Take-off speed. (see also V_{LOF})
V_{tocs}	Take-off climbout speed (helicopters)
V_{tos}	Minimum speed for a positive rate of climb with one engine inoperative
V_{t_{max}}	Max threshold speed
V_{wo}	Maximum window or canopy open operating speed
V_{X_{SE}}	Best angle of climb speed with one engine inoperative (OEI) in a light, twin-engine aircraft – the speed that provides the most altitude gain per unit of horizontal distance following an engine failure, while maintaining a small bank angle that should be presented with the engine-out climb performance data.
V_{Y_{SE}}	Best rate of climb speed with one engine inoperative (OEI) in a light, twin-engine aircraft – the speed that provides the most altitude gain per unit of time following an engine failure, while maintaining a small bank angle that should be presented with the engine-out climb performance data.
V_{ZF}	Minimum zero flaps speed
V_{ZRC}	Zero rate of climb speed. The aircraft is at sufficiently low speed on the "back of the drag curve" that it cannot climb, accelerate, or turn, so must reduce drag. The aircraft cannot be recovered without loss of height.

== Mach numbers ==
Whenever a limiting speed is expressed by a Mach number, it is expressed relative to the local speed of sound, e.g. V_{MO}: Maximum operating speed, M_{MO}: Maximum operating Mach number.

== V_{1} definitions ==
V_{1} is the critical engine failure recognition speed or takeoff decision speed. It is the speed above which the takeoff will continue even if a problem occurs, such as an engine failure or a blown tire. The speed varies among aircraft types and according to aircraft weight, runway length, wing flap setting, engine thrust used, and runway surface contamination, it is determined by the pilots before takeoff. Aborting a takeoff after V_{1} is strongly discouraged because the aircraft may not be able to stop before the end of the runway, thus suffering a runway overrun.

V_{1} is defined differently in different jurisdictions, and definitions change over time as aircraft regulations are amended. The US Federal Aviation Administration and the European Union Aviation Safety Agency define it as: "the maximum speed in the takeoff at which the pilot must take the first action (e.g., apply brakes, reduce thrust, deploy speed brakes) to stop the airplane within the accelerate-stop distance. V_{1} also means the minimum speed in the takeoff, following a failure of the critical engine at V_{EF}, at which the pilot can continue the takeoff and achieve the required height above the takeoff surface within the takeoff distance." V_{1} thus includes reaction time. In addition to this reaction time, a safety margin equivalent to 2 seconds at V_{1} is added to the accelerate-stop distance.

However, Transport Canada defines it as: "Critical engine failure recognition speed" and adds: "This definition is not restrictive. An operator may adopt any other definition outlined in the aircraft flight manual (AFM) of TC type-approved aircraft as long as such definition does not compromise operational safety of the aircraft."

== See also ==
- ICAO recommendations on use of the International System of Units
- Balanced field takeoff
