= Northrop Grumman Switchblade =

American oblique wing UAV project

Switchblade
- Switchblade in oblique position

General information
- Type: oblique flying wing UAV
- National origin: United States
- Manufacturer: Northrop Grumman

Switchblade in the conventional position

The Northrop Grumman Switchblade was a proposed variable sweep oblique wing unmanned aerial vehicle studied by Northrop Grumman for the United States.

The program was canceled in 2008, without any aircraft having flown.

== History ==
During WWII, Messerschmitt and Blohm + Voss studied the variable-geometry oblique wing as a solution for high-speed jet aircraft, respectively as Messerschmitt P.1109 and Blohm & Voss P 202. From 1979 to 1982, NASA successfully flew the piloted AD-1 demonstrator aircraft which validated the concept.

The United States Defence Advanced Research Projects Agency (DARPA) subsequently awarded Northrop Grumman a US$10.3 million contract for risk reduction and preliminary planning for an oblique flying wing demonstrator.

The program aimed at producing a technology demonstrator aircraft to explore the various challenges which radical design entails. The proposed aircraft would be a purely flying wing (an aircraft with no other auxiliary surfaces such as tails, canards, or a fuselage) where the wing is swept with one side of the aircraft forward, and one backwards in an asymmetric fashion. This aircraft configuration is believed to give it a combination of high speed, long range and long endurance. The program entailed two phases. Phase I explored the theory and result in a conceptual design, while Phase II would have resulted in the design, manufacture, and flight test of an aircraft. The outcome of the program would have resulted in data which could then be used when considering future military aircraft designs.

Flight of the Switchblade was scheduled for 2020 with its 61-meter long oblique wing perpendicular to its engines like a typical aircraft. As the aircraft increased speed, the wing begins to pivot, so that when it breaks the sound barrier, its wing has swiveled 60 degrees, with one wingtip pointing forward and the other backward. The change in aerodynamics and the general structure would have made the aircraft very difficult to control for a human being. The plane was to be fully controlled by an onboard computer controlling flight parameters. Following Phase I the aircraft concept was cancelled in 2008.

== Specifications ==
General characteristics

- Wingspan: 200 ft 2 in (61 m)

Performance

- Maximum speed: Mach 2
- Range: 5,000 nmi (5,800 mi, 9,300 km)
- Service ceiling: 60,000 ft (18,000 m)

== See also ==
- History of unmanned aerial vehicles
- Robert T. Jones
- Unmanned combat aerial vehicle
