= Minimum control speeds =

Specified speed which an aircraft must maintain to retain full aerodynamic control

The minimum control speed (V_{MC}) of a multi-engine aircraft (specifically an airplane) is a V-speed that specifies the calibrated airspeed below which directional or lateral control of the aircraft can no longer be maintained, after the failure of one or more engines. The V_{MC} only applies if at least one engine is still operative, and will depend on the stage of flight. Indeed, multiple V_{MC}s have to be calculated for landing, air travel, and ground travel, and there are more still for aircraft with four or more engines. These are all included in the aircraft flight manual of all multi-engine aircraft. When design engineers are sizing an airplane's vertical tail and flight control surfaces, they have to take into account the effect this will have on the airplane's minimum control speeds.

Minimum control speeds are typically established by flight tests as part of an aircraft certification process. They provide a guide to the pilot in the safe operation of the aircraft.

== Physical description ==
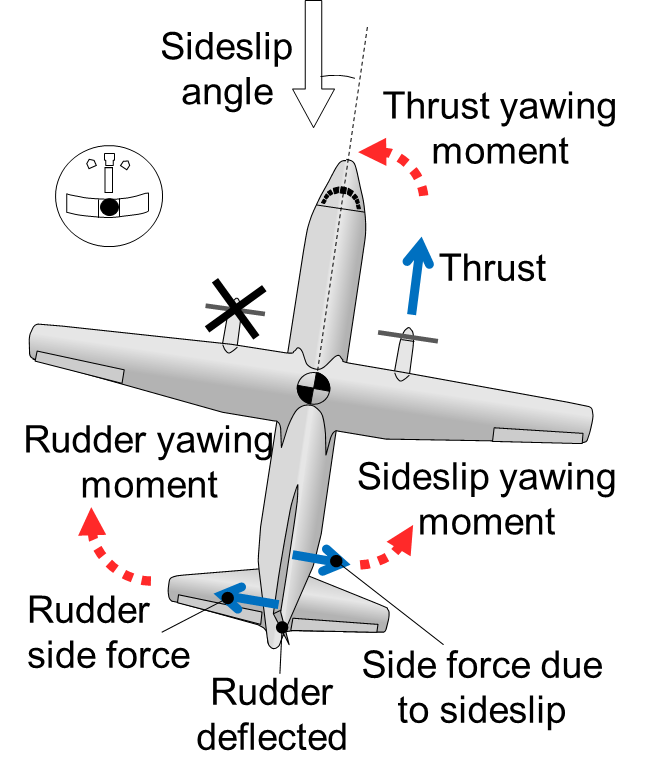
The most important forces and moments acting on the aircraft while using the rudder to counteract the asymmetrical thrust and while keeping the wings level. Notice a sideslip cannot be avoided when the yawing moment is being counteracted.

When an engine on a multi-engine aircraft fails, the thrust distribution on the aircraft becomes asymmetrical, resulting in a yawing moment in the direction of the failed engine. A sideslip develops, causing the total drag of the aircraft to increase considerably, resulting in a drop in the aircraft's rate of climb. The rudder, and to a certain extent the ailerons via the use of bank angle, are the only aerodynamic controls available to the pilot to counteract the asymmetrical thrust yawing moment.

The higher the speed of the aircraft, the easier it is to counteract the yawing moment using the aircraft's controls. The minimum control speed is the airspeed below which the force the rudder or ailerons can apply to the aircraft is not large enough to counteract the asymmetrical thrust at a maximum power setting. Above this speed it should be possible to maintain control of the aircraft and maintain straight flight with asymmetrical thrust.

Loss of engine power of wing-mounted-propeller aircraft and blown lift aircraft affects the lift distribution over the wing, causing a roll toward the inoperative engine. In some aircraft roll authority is more limiting than rudder authority in determining V_{MC}s.

== Certification and variants ==
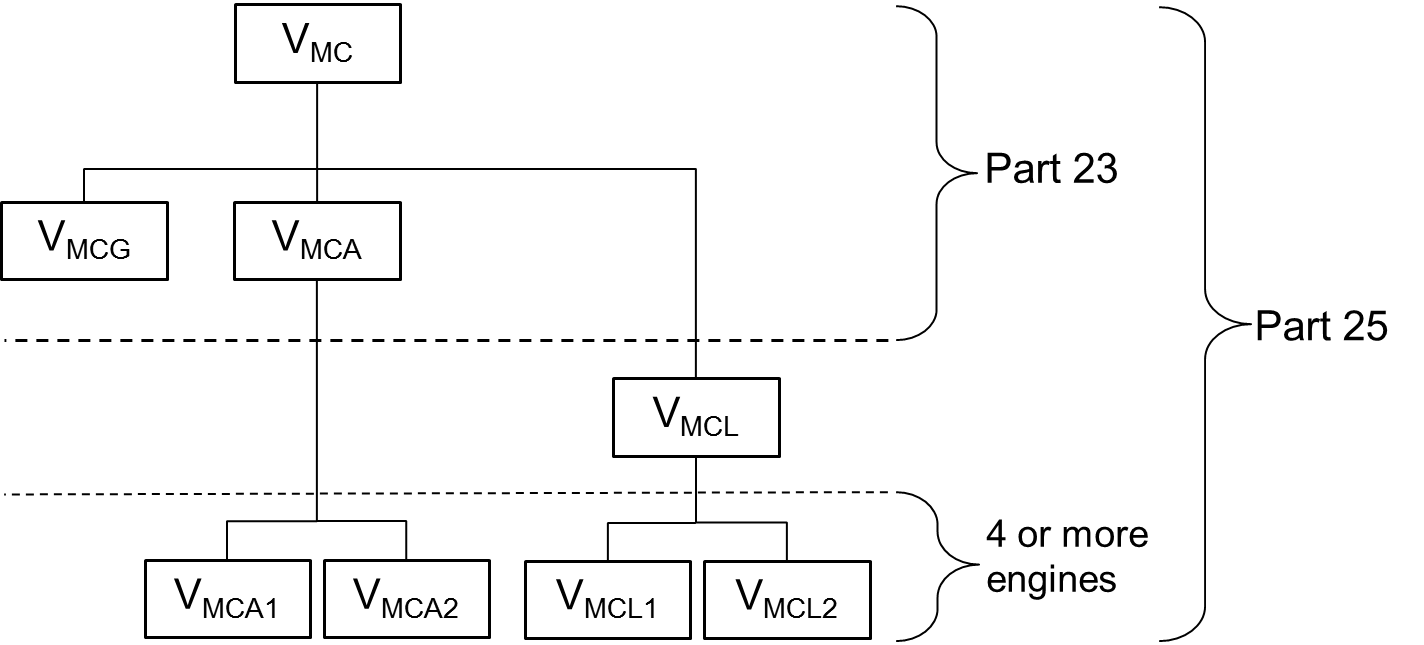
Fig. 1. Overview of all existing minimum control speeds V_{MC} for all multi-engine aircraft types. In this article, V_{MC(A)} is used rather than V_{MC} for air minimum control speeds.

Aviation regulations (such as FAR and EASA) define several different V_{MC}s and require design engineers to size the vertical tail and the aerodynamic flight controls of the aircraft to comply with these regulations. The minimum control speed in the air (V_{MCA}) is the most important minimum control speed of a multi-engine aircraft, which is why V_{MCA} is simply listed as V_{MC} in many aviation regulations and aircraft flight manuals. On the airspeed indicator of a twin-engine aircraft of less than 6000 lbs (2722 kg), the V_{MCA} is indicated by a red radial line, as standardised by FAR 23.

Most test pilot schools use multiple, more specific minimum control speeds, as V_{MC} will change depending on the stage of flight. Other defined V_{MC}s include minimum control speed on the ground (V_{MCG}) and minimum control speed during approach and landing (V_{MCL}). In addition, with aircraft with four or more engines, V_{MC}s exist for cases with either one or two engines inoperative on the same wing. Figure 1 illustrates the V_{MC}s that are defined in the relevant civil aviation regulations and in military specifications.

== Minimum control speed when airborne ==
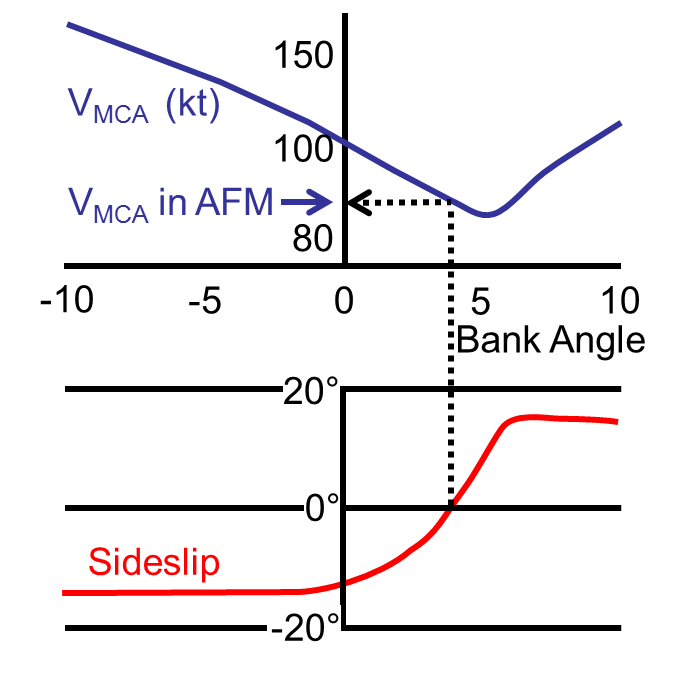
The effect of bank angle on V_{MCA} and sideslip when the left engine (No. 1) is inoperative and the other is at maximum thrust. The bank angle for zero sideslip is used for sizing the vertical tail and also during flight-testing to determine V_{MCA} in-flight.

The vertical tail or vertical stabilizer of a multi-engine aircraft plays a crucial role in maintaining directional control while an engine fails or is inoperative. The larger the tail, the more capable it will be of providing the required force to counteract the asymmetrical thrust yawing moment. This means that the smaller the tail is, the higher the V_{MCA} will be. However, a larger tail is more costly and harder to accommodate, and comes with other aerodynamic issues such as increased prevalence of slipstreams. Engineers designing the vertical tail must make a decision based on, amongst other factors, their budget, the weight of the aircraft, and the maximum bank angle of 5° (away from the inoperative engine), as stated by FAR.

V_{MCA} is also used to calculate the minimum takeoff safety speed. A high V_{MCA} therefore results in higher takeoff speeds, and so longer runways are required, which is undesirable for airport operators.

== Factors influencing minimum control speed ==
Any factor that has influence on the balance of forces and on the yawing and rolling moments after engine failure might also affect V_{MC}s. When the vertical tail is designed and the V_{MCA} is measured, the worst-case scenario for all factors is taken into account. This ensures that the V_{MC}s published in the AFMs guaranteed to be safe.

Heavier aircraft are more stable and more resistant to yawing moments, and therefore have lower V_{MCA}s. The longitudinal centre of gravity affects the V_{MCA} as well: the further from the tail it is, the lower the minimum control speed, because the rudder will be able to provide a larger yawing moment, and so it is easier to counteract the imbalance in thrust. The lateral centre of gravity also has an effect: the nearer the inoperative engine it is, the larger the moment of the working engine, and so the more force the rudder has to apply. This means that if the lateral centre of gravity shifts towards the inoperative engine, the aircraft's V_{MCA} will increase. The thrust of most engines depends on altitude and temperature; increasing altitude and higher temperatures decrease thrust. This means that if the air temperature is higher and the aircraft has a higher altitude, the force of the operative engine will be lower, the rudder will have to provide less counteractive force, and so the V_{MCA} will be lower. The bank angle also influences the minimum control speed. A small bank angle away from the inoperative engine is required for smallest possible sideslip and therefore lower V_{MCA}. Finally, if the P-factor of the working engine increases, then its yawing moment increases, and the aircraft's V_{MCA} increases as a result.

== Other minimal control speeds ==
=== Aircraft with more engines ===
Aircraft with four or more engines have not only a V_{MCA} (often called V_{MCA1} under these circumstances), where the critical engine alone is inoperative, but also a V_{MCA2} that applies when the engine inboard of the critical engine, on the same wing, is also inoperative. Civil aviation regulations (FAR, CS and equivalent) no longer require a V_{MCA2} to be determined, although it is still required for military aircraft with four or more engines. On turbojet and turbofan aircraft, the outboard engines are usually equally critical. Three-engine aircraft such as the MD-11 and BN-2 Trislander do not have a V_{MCA2}; a failed centerline engine has no effect on V_{MC}.

When two opposing engines of aircraft with four or more engines are inoperative, there is no thrust asymmetry, hence there is no rudder requirement for maintaining steady straight flight; V_{MCA}s play no role. There may be less power available to maintain flight overall, but the minimum safe control speeds remain the same as they would be for an aircraft being flown at 50% thrust on all four engines.

Failure of a single inboard engine, from a set of four, has a much smaller effect on controllability. This is because an inboard engine is closer to the aircraft's centre of gravity, so the lack of yawing moment is decreased. In this situation, if speed is maintained at or above the published V_{MCA}, as determined for the critical engine, safe control can be maintained.

=== Ground ===
If an engine fails during taxiing or takeoff, the thrust yawing moment will force the aircraft to one side on the runway. If the airspeed is not high enough and hence, the rudder-generated side force is not powerful enough, the aircraft will deviate from the runway centerline and may even veer off the runway. The airspeed at which the aircraft, after engine failure, deviates 9.1 m from the runway centerline, despite using maximum rudder but without the use of nose wheel steering, is the minimum control speed on the ground (V_{MCG}).

=== Approach and landing ===
The minimum control speed during approach and landing (V_{MCL}) is similar to V_{MCA}, but the aircraft configuration is the landing configuration. V_{MCL} is defined for both part 23 <FAR 23.149 (c)> and part 25 aircraft in civil aviation regulations. However, when maximum thrust is selected for a go-around, the flaps will be selected up from the landing position, and V_{MCL} no longer applies, but V_{MCA} does.

=== Safe single-engine speed ===
Due to the inherent risks of operating at or close to V_{MCA} with asymmetric thrust, and the desire to simulate and practice these manoeuvres in pilot training and certification V_{SSE} may be defined. V_{SSE} safe single-engine speed is the minimum speed to intentionally render the critical engine inoperative, established and designated by the manufacturer as the safe, intentional, one engine inoperative speed. This speed is selected to reduce the accident potential from loss of control due to simulated engine failures at inordinately slow airspeed.
