= Oblique wing =

Experimental aircraft wing design

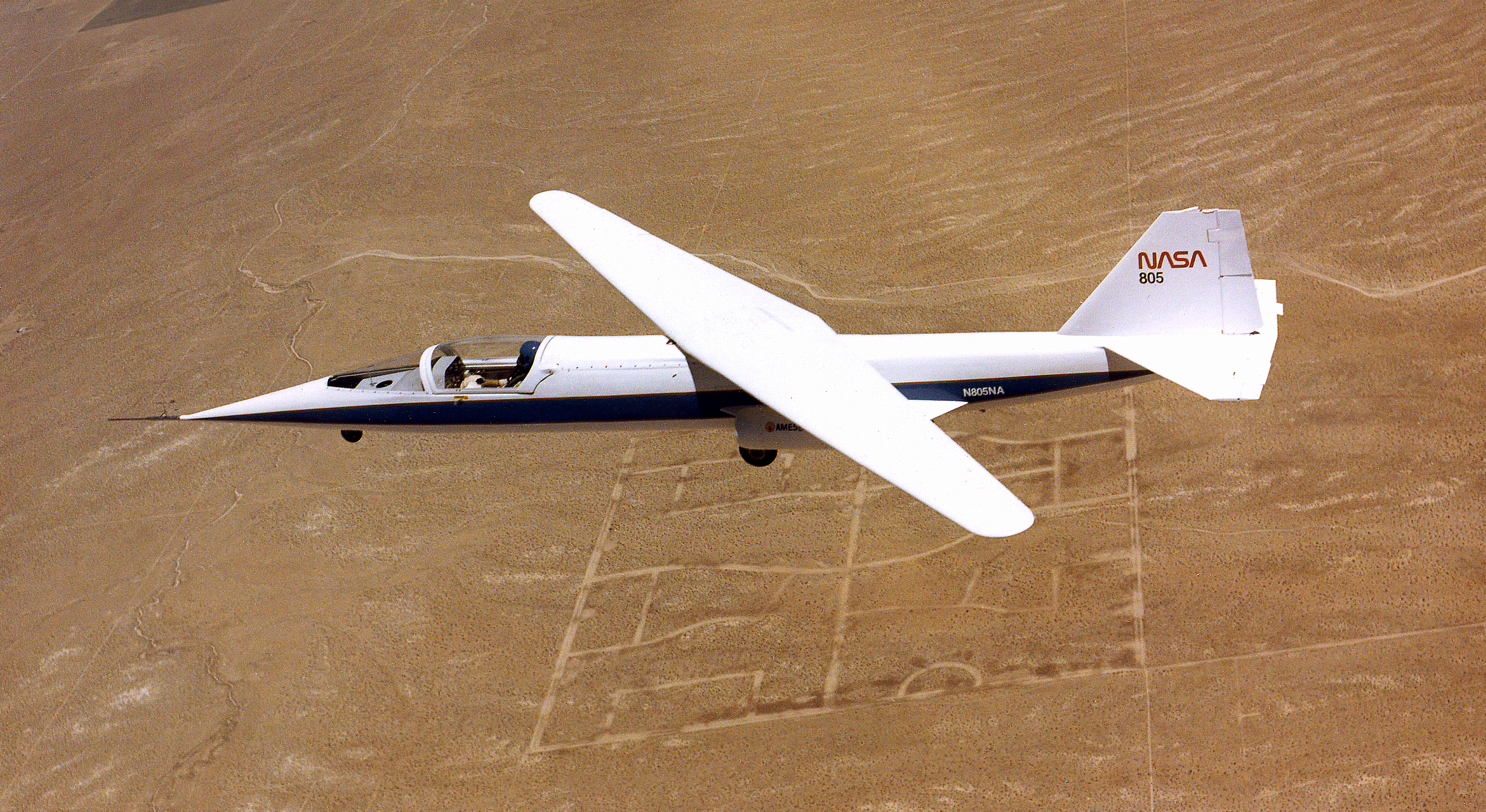
Oblique wing on a NASA AD-1

An oblique wing (also called a slewed wing) is a variable geometry wing concept. On an aircraft so equipped, the wing is designed to rotate on center pivot, so that one tip is swept forward while the opposite tip is swept aft. By changing its sweep angle in this way, drag can be reduced at high speed (with the wing swept) without sacrificing low speed performance (with the wing perpendicular). This is a variation on the classic swing-wing design, intended to simplify construction and retain the center of gravity as the sweep angle is changed.

== History ==
The oldest examples of this technology are the unrealized German aircraft projects Blohm & Voss P.202 and Messerschmitt Me P.1009-01 from the year 1944, based on a Messerschmitt patent. Shortly after the conclusion of the Second World War, the German aircraft designer Dr. Richard Vogt was brought to the US during Operation Paperclip. The oblique wing concept was resurrected by the American aeronautical engineer Robert T. Jones during the 1950s. A series of analytical and wind tunnel studies initiated by Jones at NASA Ames Research Center, Moffett Field, California, indicated that a transport-size oblique-wing aircraft, flying at speeds up to Mach 1.4, would have substantially better aerodynamic performance than aircraft with more conventional wings. The concept also appeared in Rockwell's proposal for the Advanced Carrier-Based Multirole Fighter (VFMX) program in the 1980s.

In the 1970s, an uncrewed propeller-driven aircraft was constructed and tested at Moffett Field. Known as the NASA Oblique Wing, the project pointed out a craft's unpleasant characteristics at large sweep angles. So far, only one crewed aircraft, the NASA AD-1, has been built to explore this concept. Starting in 1979, it conducted numerous flight tests, during which it demonstrated a number of serious roll-coupling modes. However, further experimentation ended after 1982.

== Theory ==
The general approach is to design an aircraft that performs with high efficiency as the Mach number increases from takeoff to cruise conditions (M ~ 0.8, for a commercial aircraft). Since two different types of drag dominate in each of these two flight regimes, uniting high performance designs for each regime into a single airframe is problematic.

At low Mach numbers induced drag dominates drag concerns. Airplanes during takeoff and gliders are most concerned with induced drag. One way to reduce induced drag is to increase the effective wingspan of the lifting surface. This is why gliders have such long, narrow wings. An ideal wing has infinite span and induced drag is reduced to a two–dimensional property. At lower speeds, during takeoffs and landings, an oblique wing would be positioned perpendicular to the fuselage like a conventional wing to provide maximum lift and control qualities. As the aircraft gained speed, the wing would be pivoted to increase the oblique angle, thereby reducing the drag due to wetted area, and decreasing fuel consumption.

Alternatively, at Mach numbers increasing towards the speed of sound and beyond, wave drag dominates design concerns. As the aircraft displaces the air, a sonic wave is generated. Sweeping the wings away from the nose of the aircraft can keep the wings aft of the sonic wave, greatly reducing drag. Unfortunately, for a given wing design, increasing sweep decreases the aspect ratio. At high speeds, both subsonic and supersonic, an oblique wing would be pivoted at up to 60 degrees to the aircraft's fuselage for better high-speed performance. The studies showed these angles would decrease aerodynamic drag, permitting increased speed and longer range with the same fuel expenditure.

Fundamentally, it appears that no design can be completely optimised for both flight regimes. However, the oblique wing shows promise of getting close. By actively increasing sweep as Mach number increases, high efficiency is possible for a wide range of speeds.

Robert T. Jones theorised that an oblique flying wing could drastically improve commercial air transportation, reducing fuel costs and noise in the vicinity of airports. Military operations include the possibility of a long–endurance fighter/attack vehicle.

== NASA OFW airliner research ==
There have been investigations into an OFW platform being developed into a transcontinental airliner. NASA Ames performed a preliminary design study of a theoretical 500-seat supersonic airliner using the concept in 1991. Following this study, NASA built a small remote-controlled demonstrator aircraft with a 20-foot (6.1m) wingspan. It flew only once, for four minutes in May 1994, but in doing so, it demonstrated stable flight with oblique wing sweep from 35 degrees to 50 degrees. Despite this success, the NASA High Speed Research program, and further oblique wing studies, were canceled.

== DARPA Oblique Flying-Wing (OFW) Project ==
The United States Defense Advanced Research Projects Agency (DARPA) awarded Northrop Grumman a $10.3 million (USD) contract for risk reduction and preliminary planning for an X-plane OFW demonstrator, known as the Switchblade. That program was eventually cancelled, citing difficulties with control systems.

The program aimed at producing a technology demonstrator aircraft to explore the various challenges which the radical design entails. The proposed aircraft would be a pure flying wing (an aircraft with no other auxiliary surfaces such as tails, canards or a fuselage) where the wing is swept with one side of the aircraft forward, and one backwards in an asymmetric fashion. This aircraft configuration is believed to give it a combination of high speed, long range and long endurance. The program entailed two phases. Phase I was to explore the theory and result in a conceptual design, while Phase II covered the design, manufacture and flight test of an aircraft. The program hoped to produce a dataset that can then be used when considering future military aircraft designs.

Wind tunnel tests for the aircraft design were completed. The design was noted to be "workable and robust." The program was concluded before a flight demonstrator was constructed.

== See also ==
- Asymmetrical aircraft
- Circular wing
