= Asymmetrical aircraft =

Aircraft which have asymmetrical designs

Asymmetrical aircraft have left- and right-hand sides which are not exact mirror images of each other. Although most aircraft are symmetrical, there is no fundamental reason why they must be, and design goals can sometimes be best achieved with an asymmetrical aircraft.

== Types of asymmetry ==
Asymmetry arises from a number of design decisions. Some are inherent in the type of aircraft, while others are consciously introduced.

=== Engine torque ===
On a powerful propeller-driven aircraft, the engine torque driving the propeller creates an equal and opposite torque on the engine itself. Because the engine is fixed to the airframe, this reactive torque is transmitted to the aircraft, causing a tendency to roll in the opposite direction to the propeller.

On some early types, especially during the pioneer years, a single engine drove twin propellers and the drive was arranged to turn the propellers in opposite directions to cancel their torque. Examples include the Wright Flyer and the early designs by J.W. Dunne.

In a rotary engine, common during World War I, the whole crankcase and cylinder assembly rotates with the propeller. This gives it an especially powerful torque reaction. Some aircraft, such as the Sopwith Camel with its relatively heavy Clerget 9B engine, were noted for having a faster turn to one side than the other, which influenced combat tactics both with it and against it. By contrast, the contra-rotary Siemens-Halske engines were more balanced.

On some single-engined types with more conventional engines, such as the Italian Ansaldo SVA engine torque was counteracted by lengthening one wing to create extra lift on that side, providing a counter-torque.

As engines became more powerful towards the end of World War II, some single-engined fighters used contra-rotating propellers, both to handle the high power without increasing diameter and to reduce the torque asymmetry.

Twin-engined aircraft with their propellers rotating in the same direction are also asymmetric. Counter-rotating propellers avoid this, either by building pairs of engines to rotate their crankshafts in opposite directions, or by using a reversing gear in one of the propeller reduction gearboxes. Handed engines have rarely been used, owing to cost, but were sometimes used for naval aircraft such as the Sea Hornet, to simplify their handling across a narrow carrier deck.

The wake of a propeller gains angular momentum, which can produce an asymmetric effect over the tail control surfaces, especially during takeoff when the engine power is at maximum but the aircraft speed is low. This does not affect the symmetry or otherwise of the aircraft itself.

=== Asymmetric thrust ===
While most aircraft have a central center-of-gravity line, it can sometimes be advantageous to break symmetry. For example, a single front-mounted tractor propeller may provide sufficient thrust, alongside a nose-mounted cockpit for good pilot visibility. In such cases the engine's thrust line is offset to one side, creating a turning moment. This moment is typically counteracted by making the tail fin work as a wing turned sideways, creating sideways lift to provide an equal and opposite turning force. The Northrop Grumman B-2 Spirit stealth bomber utilizes asymmetric thrust as a means to enhance yaw control.

=== Oblique wing ===
The mechanism for varying the angle of a swept wing is complicated, heavy and expensive. The two halves must be aligned with each other and each supported at one end. A single oblique wing may be supported in the middle and without needing a linking gear. The idea has been tried successfully on the NASA AD-1.

== History ==
=== Pioneer years ===
The first airplane to fly, the Wright Flyer had an asymmetrical arrangement of pilot and engine. Both needed to be close to the centre of gravity above the front of the wing, so each was moved to one side to make room for the other. The propellers were symmetrically placed, so one engine drive chain was longer than the other. The longer, port drive belt was also twisted across itself so that the propellers rotated in opposite directions.

=== World War I ===
During World War I, Swiss-born Hans Burkhard designed several asymmetrical aircraft. Burkhard obtained German Patent number 300 676 for his design on 22 September 1915. The Gotha G.VI first flew in 1918, but did not reach production before the war concluded.

=== World War II ===
During World War II, German designer Richard Vogt experimented with several asymmetrical aircraft, including:

- Blohm & Voss BV 141 observation aircraft, 1938
- Blohm & Voss BV 237 ground-attack stuka
- Blohm & Voss P 178 jet-powered ground-attack stuka
- Blohm & Voss P.194 mixed-power ground-attack and light bomber
- Blohm & Voss P 202 oblique wing jet fighter, 1942

The BV 141 was heralded by the Germans as the first asymmetric aircraft, an evaluation batch was built, but it was never ordered into full-scale production. The BV 237 ground-attack aircraft was ordered but later cancelled.

Other projects and design studies of the period included:

- Messerschmitt P.1109 oblique wing jet
- Isaacson fighter-bomber, powered by two Napier Sabres.

=== Modern aircraft ===
- The NASA AD-1 includes oblique wings, and flew 1979-1982.
- The Rutan Boomerang is a twin-engined light aircraft featuring an 'outrigger' engine and boom beside a conventional fuselage with the engine at the front.
- The ARES was a prototype ground attack aircraft with a single engine intake on the left side of the aircraft, while a Gatling gun was mounted on the right side. This avoided the problem of combustion gases from the cannon being ingested into the intake.
