= List of Polish military aircraft =

This list intends to give an accurate detail list of the equipment currently fielded by the Polish Armed Forces.

== Potential and planned orders ==
=== Polish Armed Forces ===
Aircraft	Origin	Role	Variant	Quantity	Notes	Image
Fixed wing aircraft
ICEYE	Finland	Reconnaissance satellite	—	3	Synthetic aperture radar satellite ordered to Finland in 2025 for €200 million	

=== Polish Air Force ===
Aircraft	Origin	Role	Variant	Quantity	Notes	Image		
Fixed wing aircraft
Eurofighter or F-15EX	—	Air dominance fighter	—	32				
A330 MRTT or	Europe	Aerial refueling and multi-role transport	A330-800 MRTT Plus	4	Offered by Airbus in December 2025			
A400M	Europe	Aerial refueling and multi-role transport	Strategic and tactical transport aircraft	4	—		10	Offered by Airbus in December 2025
Training fleet
AW109 Trekker, or H145M	—	Rotorcraft trainer	—	24	Replacement of PZL SW-4 Puszczyk. The offers are: AW109T; H145M			
UAV
MQ-9 Reaper	United States	UCAV	MQ-9B	Unknown				

=== Polish Land Force ===
Aircraft	Origin	Role	Variant	Quantity	Notes	Image
Helicopter
AH-64	United States	Attack helicopter	AH-64E	96	Letter of Request aiming at purchase of additional 96 units was approved by the US	
AW-101	United Kingdom; Italy	Heavy lift helicopters	—	22	Successor of the Mi-8 / 17	

=== Polish Navy ===
Programme	Role	Origin	Potential aircraft	Quantity	Notes	Image
Helicopter
Kondor programme	Ship based helicopters 6.5 t MTOW class	France	AS 565 Panther	4 - 8	Successor to the Kaman SH-2G	
Kondor programme	Ship based helicopters 6.5 t MTOW class	Canada	UH-1Y Venom	4 - 8	Successor to the Kaman SH-2G	
Kondor programme	Ship based helicopters 6.5 t MTOW class	United Kingdom	AW159 Wildcat	4 - 8	Successor to the Kaman SH-2G	
UAV
Gryf programme	Tactical, medium-range UAVs	Poland; United Kingdom; Israel	Watchkeeper X UAV	Unclear	WB Group signed an agreement with British joint-venture company U-TacS (Elbit Systems and Thales)	
Gryf programme	Tactical, medium-range UAVs	Italy	Falco EVO	Unclear	Offered by Leonardo	
