= Blohm & Voss P.202 =

German oblique wing jet fighter project

P.202

General information
- Manufacturer: Blohm & Voss
- Designer: Richard Vogt
- Status: Design project

The Blohm & Voss P.202 was an unusual design study for a variable-geometry jet fighter during World War II. It was the first design to incorporate a slewed wing (also known as an oblique or scissor wing) in which one side swept forward and the other back. The P.202 was never built or flown.

== Design ==
The high speeds attainable by jet aeroplanes led German workers to develop the swept wing, in order to minimise the problems met as the speed of sound was approached. But sweeping the wings causes problems of its own, especially at the low speeds used for takeoff and landing. A variable-sweep mechanism was one possible solution but it would be complex, heavy and expensive. It also has problems with movement of the centre of lift. Both backwards and forwards sweep were investigated and they proved to have opposite disadvantages. Sweeping one wing forwards and the other back would balance out the aerodynamic problems and a one-piece slewed wing approach would not need such a complex sweep mechanism.

The P.202 jet fighter project emerged as Blohm & Voss designer Richard Vogt's ingenious solution. Conventional in other respects, the high-mounted wing could be slewed by up to 35° for high-speed flight. The wing span was 12.0 metres (39.4 ft) when unswept and 10.0 metres (32.8 ft) when fully swept.

The long main undercarriage retracted into the wing, while a nose wheel completed the tricycle undercarriage.

The P.202 was powered by a pair of BMW 003 turbojets, slung underneath the fuselage centre section and exhausting behind the wing.

Provision for three forward-firing cannon was made in the nose.

== Specifications ==
Data from Masters (1982)

General characteristics

- Crew: 1
- Wingspan: 12 m (39 ft 4 in) straight, 10 metres (32 ft 10 in) swept
- Powerplant: 2 × BMW 003 turbojet, 7.85 kN (1,764 lbf) thrust each

Armament

- Guns: 3 x cannon

== See also ==
- Asymmetrical aircraft
- NASA AD-1
- Northrop Grumman Switchblade
