= GAU-12 Equalizer =

25 mm rotary aircraft autocannon

GAU-12/U Equalizer
- Type: Rotary cannon
- Place of origin: United States

Production history
- Designer: General Electric
- Manufacturer: General Dynamics

Specifications
- Mass: GAU-12: 270 pounds (120 kg) with feed system GAU-22: 230 pounds (100 kg) without feed system
- Length: 83.2 in (2.11 m)
- Width: GAU-12: 11.5 inches (290 mm); GAU-22: 11.1–13.3 inches (280–340 mm)
- Height: 10.2 inches (260 mm)
- Cartridge: 25 × 137 mm
- Caliber: 25 mm (0.98 in)
- Barrels: GAU-12: 5-barrel GAU-22: 4-barrel (progressive RH parabolic twist, 11 grooves)
- Action: Hydraulic, Electric, Pneumatic
- Rate of fire: GAU-12: 1,800–4,200 rounds per minute GAU-22: 3,300 rounds per minute
- Muzzle velocity: (HEI) 3,400 ft/s (1,040 m/s); (API) 3,280 ft/s (1,000 m/s); (APEX) 3,200 ft/s (970 m/s)
- Maximum firing range: 12,000 feet (3,660 m)
- Feed system: Linked or linkless
- Sights: Lead Computing Optical Sight System (LCOSS)

The General Dynamics GAU-12/U Equalizer is a five-barrel 25 mm Gatling-type rotary cannon. The GAU-12/U is used by the United States, Italy, and Spain, which mount the weapon in their attack jets such as the AV-8B Harrier II, airborne gunships such as the Lockheed AC-130, and land-based fighting vehicles. A lighter four-barrel version, designated GAU-22/A, is mounted on F-35 Lightning II fighter jets.

== Development ==
The five-barrel Equalizer cannon was developed in the late 1970s, based on the mechanism of the 30mm GAU-8/A Avenger cannon, but firing a new NATO series of 25 mm ammunition. The GAU-12/U cannon is operated by an 11 kW (15 hp) electric motor, or in external mounts supplied by a bleed air driven pneumatic system. Its rate of fire is normally 3,600 rounds per minute, with a maximum of 4,200 rounds per minute. For use in the AC-130 gunship, the fire rate is limited to 1,800 rounds per minute in order to conserve ammunition and reduce barrel wear.

=== GAU-22/A ===
The GAU-22/A is a four-barrel version of the GAU-12/U designed for use on the F-35 Lightning II. The GAU-22/A's major difference is the use of four barrels, rather than the GAU-12/U's five barrels. The GAU-22/A is therefore lighter, with a reduced rate of fire of 3,300 rounds per minute, but maintains the same, high accuracy of 5 milliradians, 80% circle of the GAU-12 and A-10's GAU-8. The weapon is produced by General Dynamics Ordnance and Tactical Systems.

The Nammo 25 mm PGU-47/U APEX (Armor Piercing with Explosive) projectile has been developed for the GAU-22/A. It features a tungsten carbide penetrator in the tip and an explosive fragmentation body, to be multi-purpose against both hardened and soft targets. Also, the presence of a clockworking inertia-driven mechanical fuze in the mid-body, protects the round from shocks, misfires and cookoffs, making it safer to handle and fire.

== Uses ==
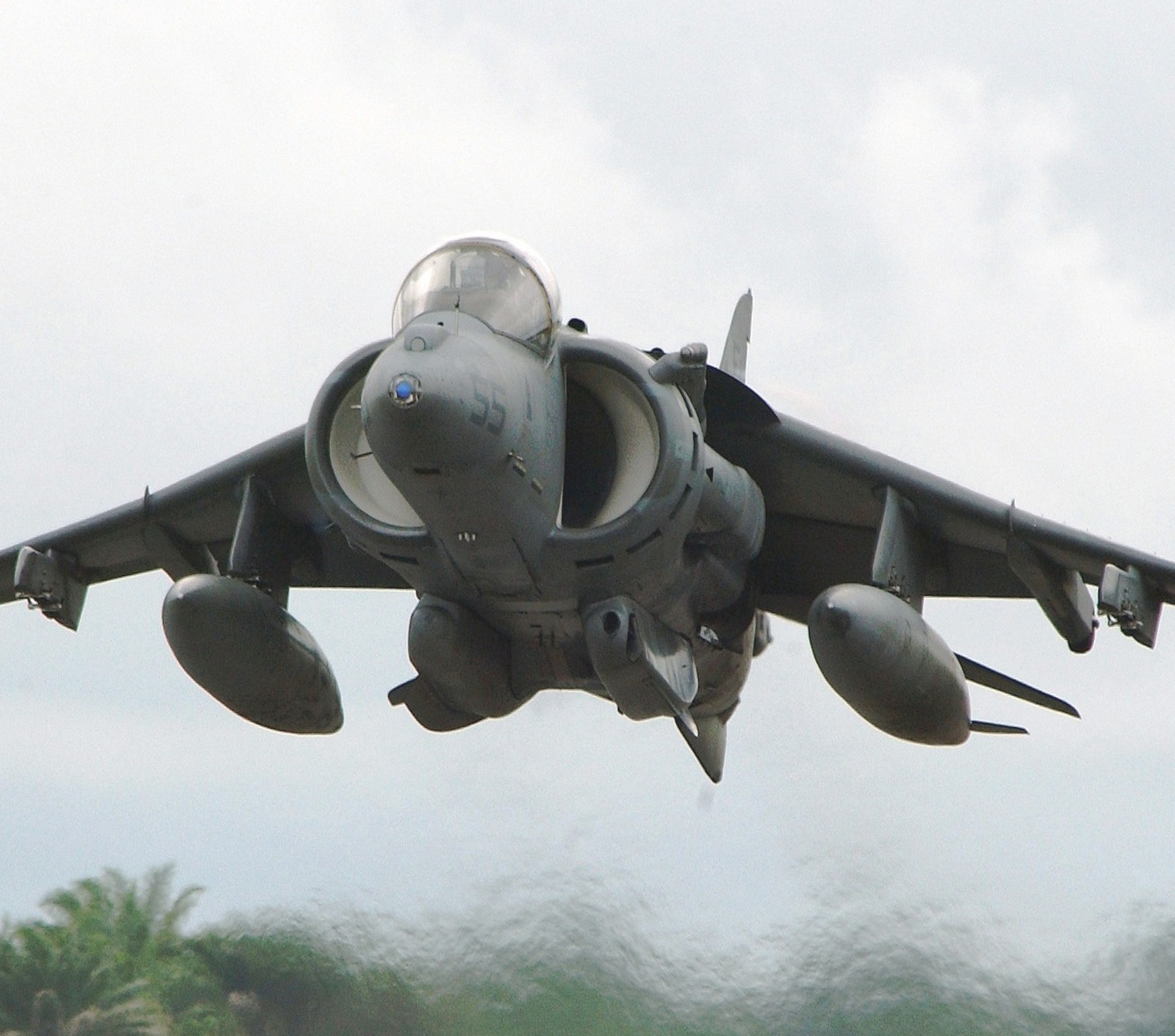
An AV-8 Harrier II; the two pods on the belly of the aircraft hold the cannon (port side, visible hole) and ammunition (starboard side).

The current principal application for the Equalizer is the AV-8 Harrier IIs of the United States Marine Corps, Italian Navy and Spanish Navy. The Harrier II carries the Equalizer system in a pair of detachable pods mounted on the fuselage underside, with the cannon in the port pod and 300 rounds of ammunition in the starboard pod, fed through a bridge at the aft ends of the pods that also contains the drive system for the gun (unlike previous Harriers which used dual cannons, with each pod containing a 30mm ADEN gun and its own ammunition supply). The complete installation, which includes a double-ended feed system that returns empty cartridges to the magazine, weighs 900 lb (410 kg) empty and 1,230 lb (560 kg) loaded. The detachable pods are located and shaped to be interchangeable with the usual ventral strakes or fences under the Harrier, both serving to help trap a cushion of high-pressure air under the aircraft to add lift while in hover mode. The strakes can easily be removed and the pods attached in their place, serving the same function while adding useful firepower.

RAF and Fleet Air Arm Harriers did not adopt the Equalizer for their Harrier GR7 and GR9s. The British had originally planned a pair of ADEN 25 guns (using the same ammunition as the GAU-12/U, but based on the 30 mm ADEN cannon). That gun was canceled in 1999 after protracted development problems, and British Harrier GR7/9s were without gun armament until retirement.

The Equalizer is also used in the AC-130U Spooky gunship, where one cannon is mounted on the port side, and the U.S. Marine Corps LAV-AD air-defense vehicle. Other applications have been planned for the GAU-12/U, including a mounting for the AH-1 Cobra attack helicopter.

The Equalizer was also used as the basis for the Sea Vulcan 25, a turret mounted gun for naval ship self-defense, although not as a Close-In Weapon System, as the gun was not automatic nor did it use radar tracking. Instead the gun was manually aimed using a digital gun sight and fire control. Sea Vulcan consisted of a 540-round helical drum magazine, a one-piece aluminum turret that can be opened with just a screwdriver, and the main gun. One unique advantage of the system was that it was capable of operating independently of ship's power; the gun and ammunition magazine were powered by a 3,000 psi (21 MPa) pneumatic drive and the turret motor by twin lead–acid batteries.

Intended as a higher-firepower alternative to conventional deck-mounted machine guns and cannon, the weapon employs the Navy's Mk 24 target designator and laser range finder for enhanced accuracy. The gun was developed in the mid-1980s as a cost-effective protection for ships smaller than frigate or corvette or patrol boats, but did not enter this service.

The GAU-12 was utilized as the principal armament for the Rutan ARES.

The four-barrel GAU-22 is carried internally by the F-35A (the CTOL version of the F-35) on the port side of the fuselage, with 181 PGU-47/U APEX rounds. In contrast, the F-35B STOVL and C CATOBAR aircraft mount the GAU-22 in a stealthy external gun pod under the fuselage, together with 220 rounds.

== Specifications (GAU-12/U) ==
GAU-12/U gun test firing

- Type: Five-barreled rotary cannon
- Caliber: 25 mm (0.98 in)
- Operation: electric
- Length: 83.2 in (2.11 m)
- Weight (complete): 270 lb (122 kg)
- Rate of fire: 3,600–4,200 rounds per minute
- Muzzle velocity: (HEI) 3,400 ft/s (1,040 m/s); (API) 3,280 ft/s (1,000 m/s)
- Projectile weight: (HEI) 6.5 oz (184 g); (API) 7.6 oz (215 g)
- Muzzle energy: (HEI) 73,400 ft·lbf (99,500 joules); (API) 79,300 ft·lbf (107,500 joules)

== Specifications (GAU-22/A) ==
- Type: Four-barreled rotary cannon
- Caliber: 25 mm (0.98 in)
- Operation: electric
- Length: 83.2 in (2.11 m)
- Weight (complete): 230 lb (104 kg)
- Rate of fire: 3,300 rounds per minute
- Muzzle velocity: (APEX) 3,200 ft/s (970 m/s)
- Projectile weight: (APEX) 7.87 oz (223 g)
- Muzzle energy: (APEX) 77,400 ft·lbf (104,900 joules)

== Similar systems ==
- Gryazev-Shipunov GSh-6-23
- Myriad CIWS
