= E-Go Aeroplanes e-Go =

Ultralight aircraft

e-Go
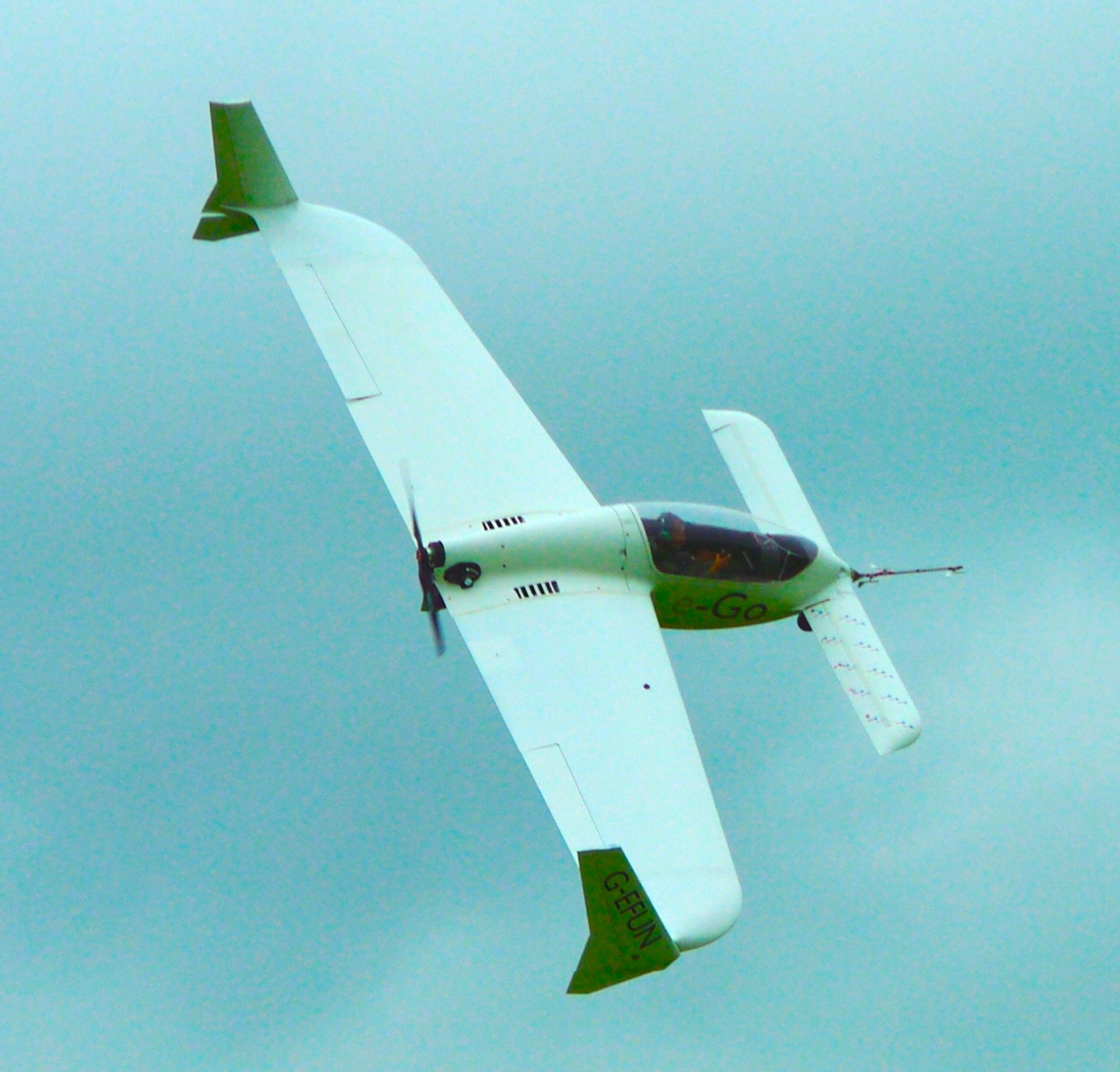

General information
- Type: Ultralight aircraft and Light-sport aircraft
- National origin: United Kingdom
- Manufacturer: e-Go Aeroplanes; GioCAS Aeronautical Consultancy
- Designer: Giotto Castelli
- Status: No updates since October 2019

History
- First flight: 24 October 2013

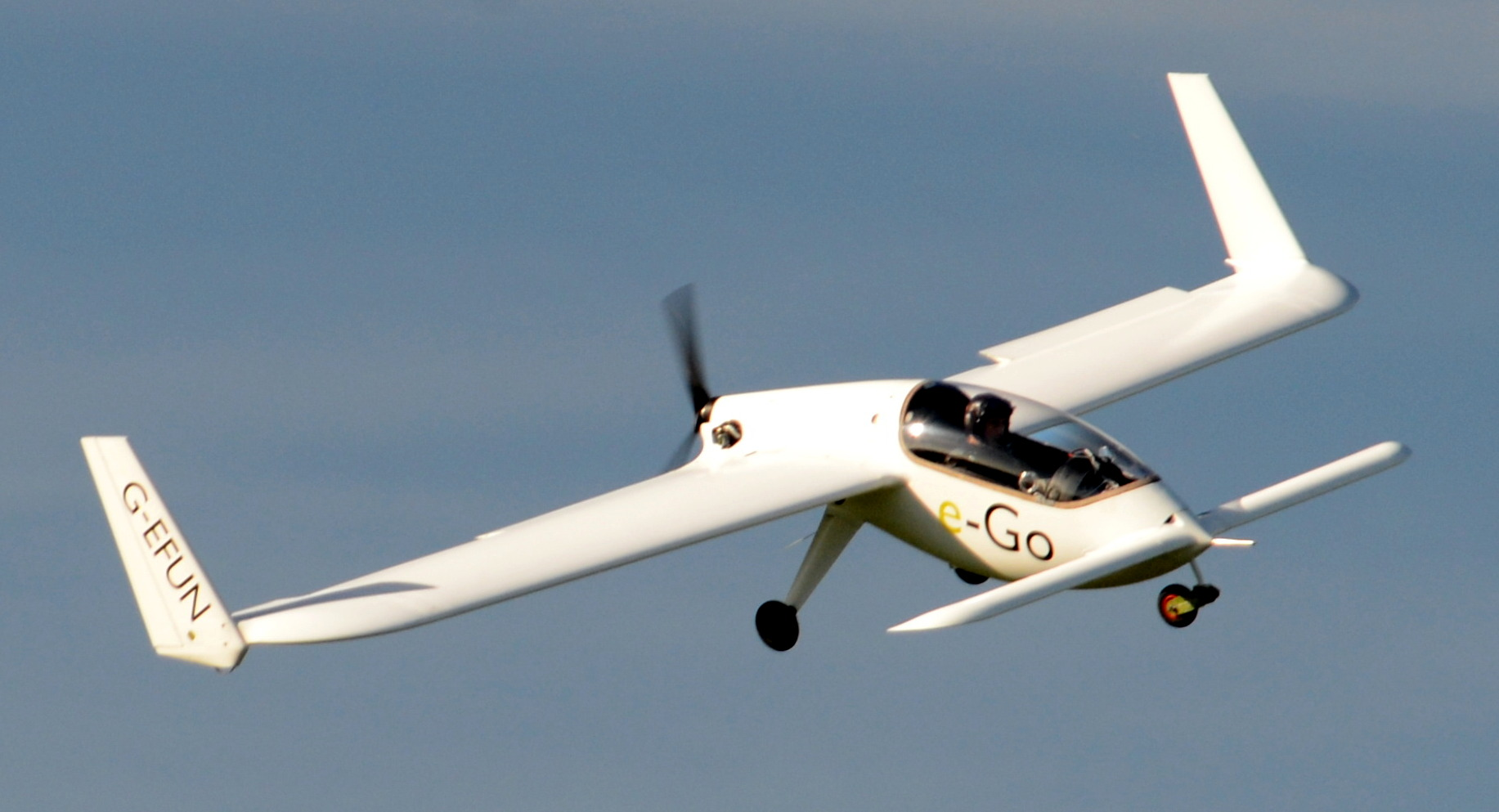
E-Go canard microlight aircraft

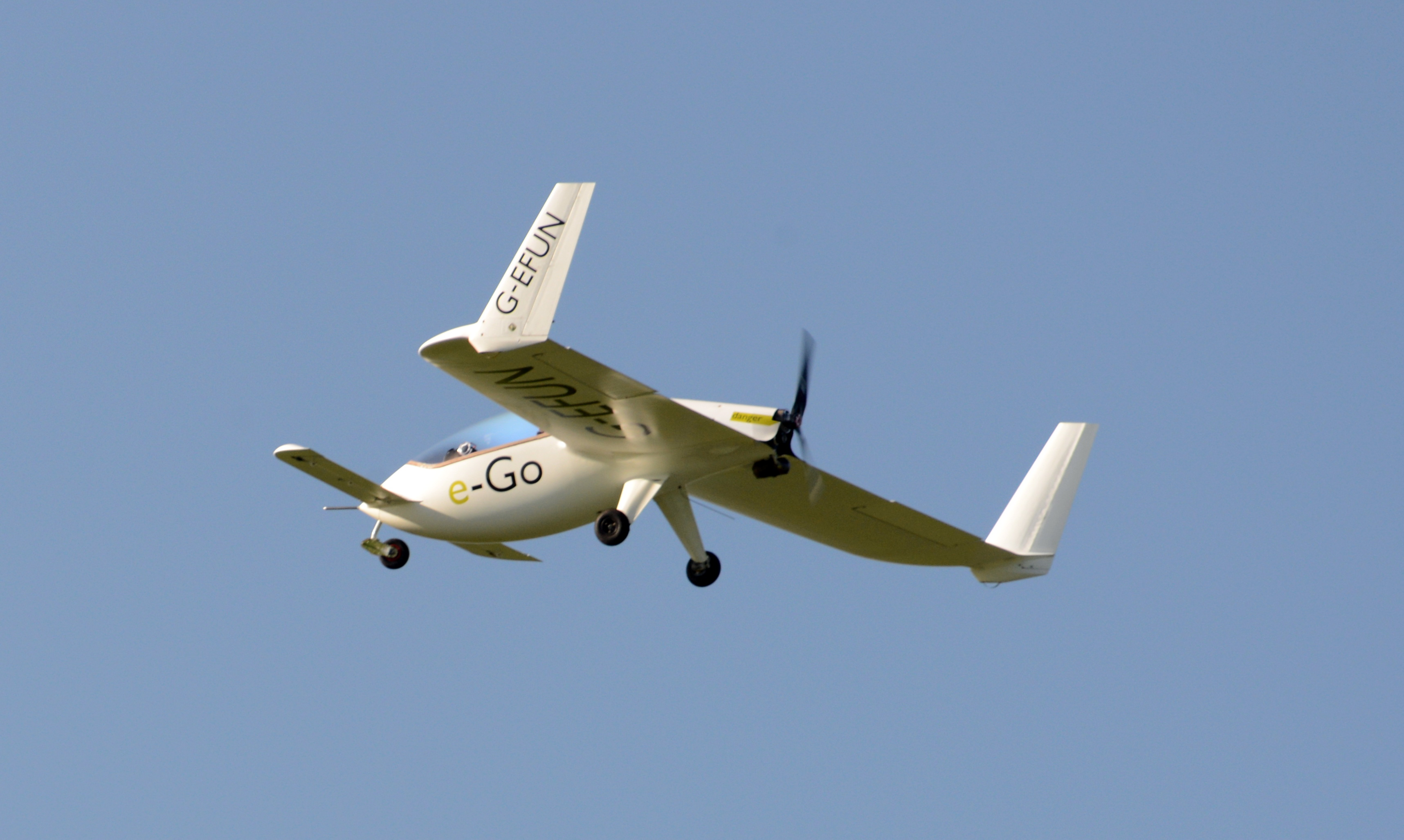
Tibenham, first public display of the e-Go, on 30 October 2013

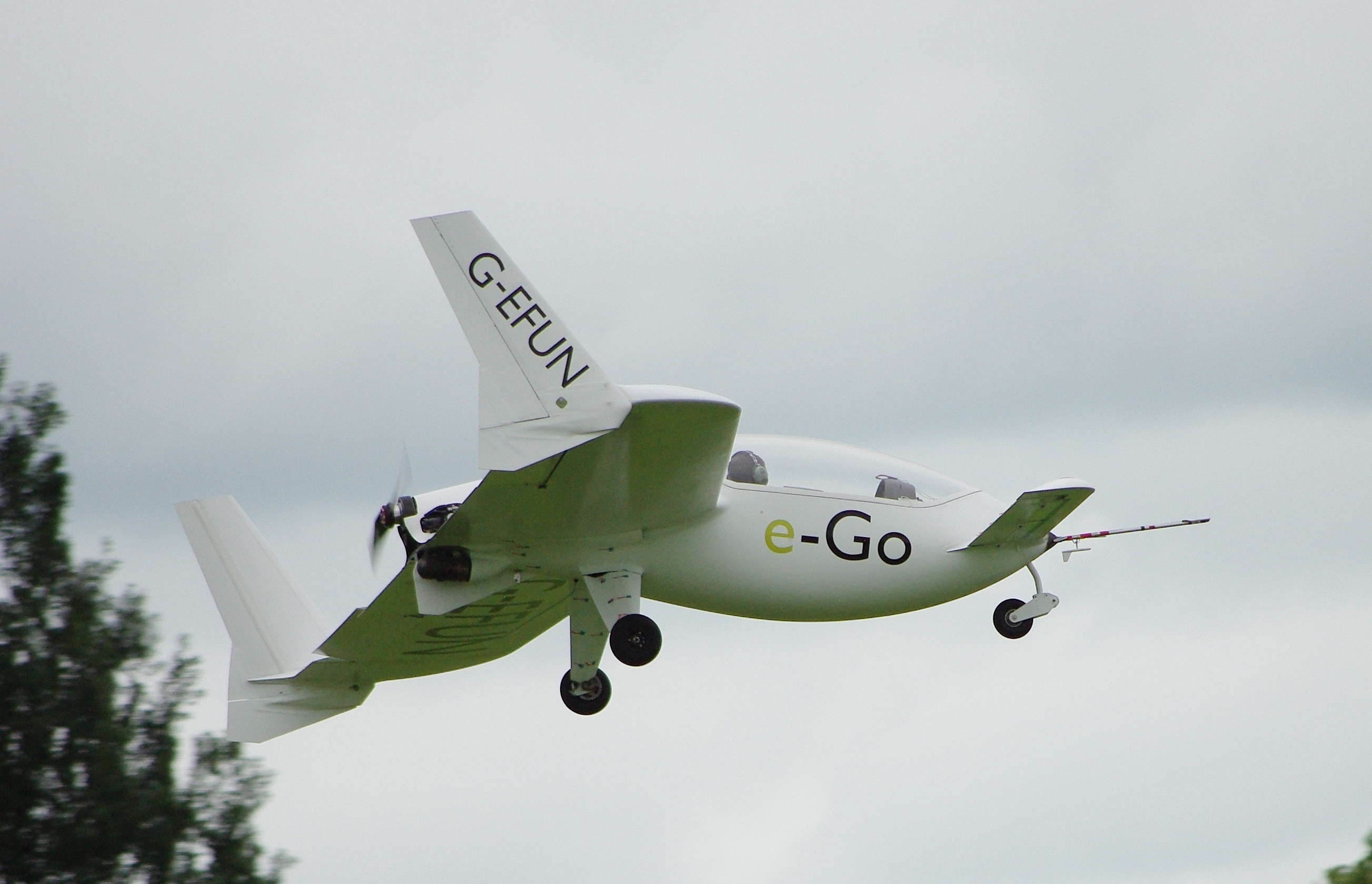
Flight at Old Warden June 2014 with extended lower fins

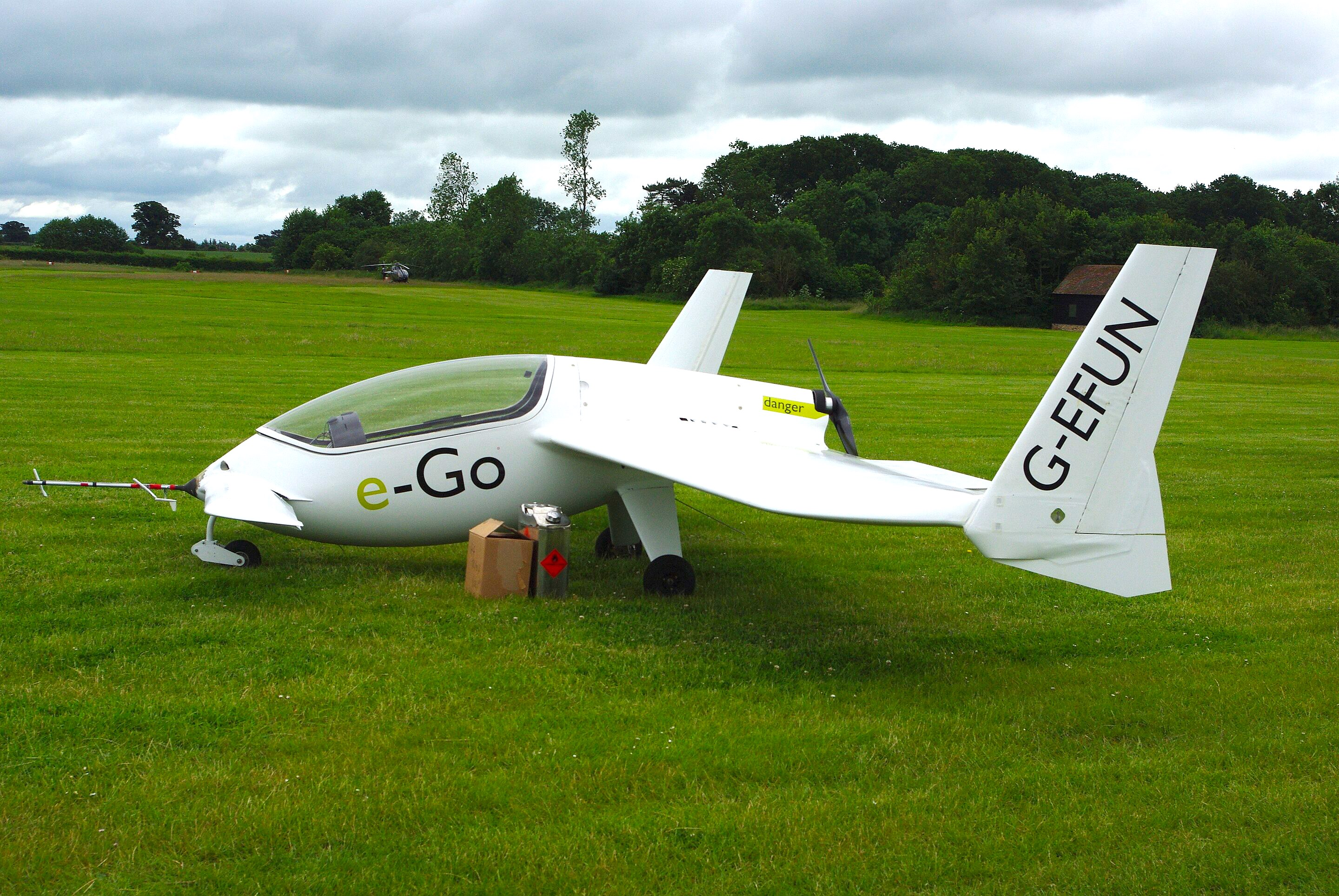
E-Go canard microlight aircraft at Old Warden

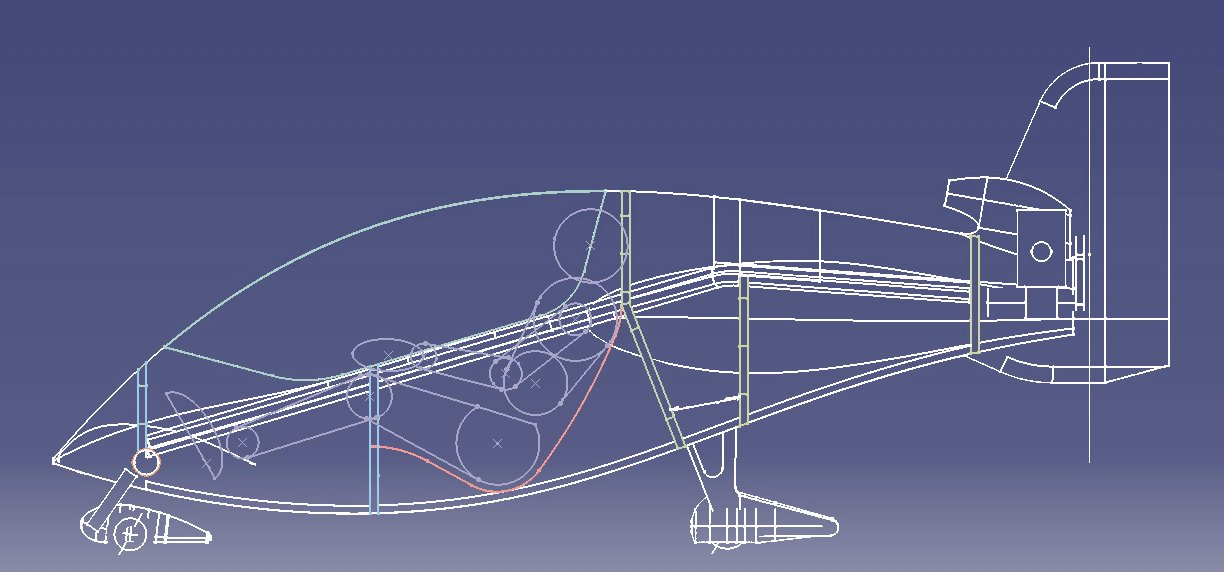
Early E-Go elevation design, with tiny wheels, aft fuselage air-intake, and unraked and unextended fins

The e-Go Aeroplanes e-Go, originally known as the E-Plane, is a British ultralight and light-sport aircraft that was designed by Giotto Castelli, that was being developed by e-Go Aeroplanes of Cambridge and since May 2017, by GioCAS Aeronautical Consultancy, also located in Cambridge.

The aircraft won the Light Aircraft Association's design competition in 2007. It was first flown on 24 October 2013, with the first public flight-test and demonstration on 30 October 2013. The aircraft was initially proposed to be supplied as a complete ready-to-fly-aircraft.

Production plans for the design were suspended and staff laid off in November 2016 as e-Go Aeroplanes was unable to raise capital in the wake of the British Brexit vote. The aircraft program was acquired by GioCAS, owned by Castelli, in May 2017, with the aim of bringing it to production. In October 2019, the GioCAS company website stated that production of the e-GO was "set to resume for 2020 deliveries"; as of October 2025, the company may no longer exist, as the website has not been updated for six years.

== Design and development ==
The aircraft was designed to comply with the United Kingdom single-seat deregulated microlight class (SSDR), as well as to comply with the Fédération Aéronautique Internationale microlight rules. The aircraft cruise speed is planned to be modified for US light-sport aircraft rules. It features a cantilever mid wing, a canard foreplane, a single-seat enclosed cockpit, fixed tricycle landing gear and a pusher engine and propeller. This follows the configuration established by the Rutan VariViggen and VariEze. The single engine is a Rotron Wankel engine based on Rotron's RT300 LCR engine which is intended for drones.

The aircraft is made from a combination of carbon fibre and foam. Its 8 m (26.2 ft) span wing has an area of 11.5 m^{2} (124 sq ft). The standard engine will be a 22 kW (30 hp) rotary engine, which is expected to give a cruise speed of 100 kn (185 km/h; 115 mph) on 3.5 L (0.8 imp gal; 0.9 US gal) per 100 km (62 mi). Each wing has twin spars to provide torsional strength. The early lift-off canopy (which needed outsiders to help the pilot vacate the cockpit) was changed to a forward-hinged design in later models.

During 2016, e-Go Aeroplanes announced that full production would not proceed without further financial input, "an investment memorandum for a third round of funding was issued and distributed in July this year ... shareholder interest generated was insufficient, coupled with the unsure financial market following Brexit. The Board made the very difficult decision to make all staff positions redundant."

In November 2016, e-Go Aeroplanes's operation was mothballed, and "overseen by Chief Operating Officer, Richard Clabon and the General Manager David Boughey". The company website stated that it was still looking for a buyer. but the company went into administration in the spring of 2017.

In May 2017 the assets of e-Go Aeroplanes were acquired by the aircraft's designer, Giotto Castelli, indicating that he would pursue production under his company, GioCAS Aeronautical Consultancy.

In October 2019, the GioCAS company website stated that production of the e-GO was "set to resume for 2020 deliveries"; as of October 2025, the company may no longer exist, with the website unchanged after six years, still looking towards a 2020 delivery schedule, and showing a VAT that is no longer registered.

== Specifications (e-Go) ==
Data from Bayerl.

General characteristics

- Crew: one
- Wingspan: 8 m (26 ft 3 in)
- Wing area: 11.5 m^{2} (124 sq ft)
- Empty weight: 115 kg (254 lb)
- Gross weight: 243 kg (536 lb)
- Fuel capacity: 25 litres (5.5 imp gal; 6.6 US gal)
- Powerplant: 1 × Rotron e-Go rotary aircraft engine , 22 kW (30 hp)
- Propellers: 3-bladed, 1.2 m (3 ft 11 in) diameter

Performance

- Maximum speed: 222 km/h (138 mph, 120 kn)
- Stall speed: 65 km/h (40 mph, 35 kn)
- Range: 610 km (380 mi, 330 nmi)
- Rate of climb: 4.6 m/s (900 ft/min)

Avionics

- MGL EFIS
