= Scaled Composites Catbird =

Model 81 Catbird
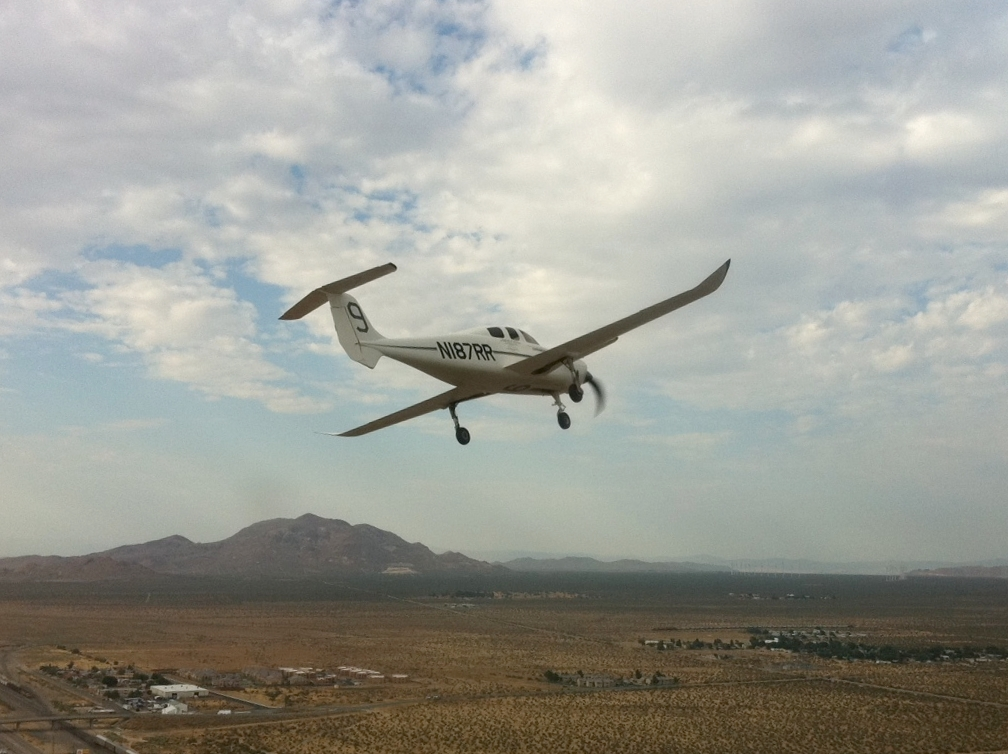
- First flight after restoration July 7, 2011

General information
- Type: General aviation aircraft
- National origin: United States
- Manufacturer: Scaled Composites
- Designer: Burt Rutan
- Status: Restored in 2011
- Number built: 1

History
- First flight: March 14, 1988

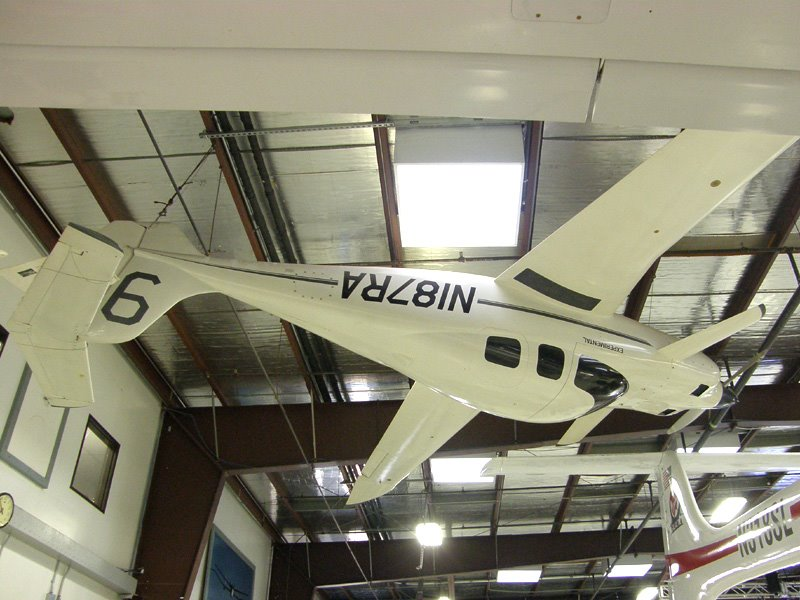

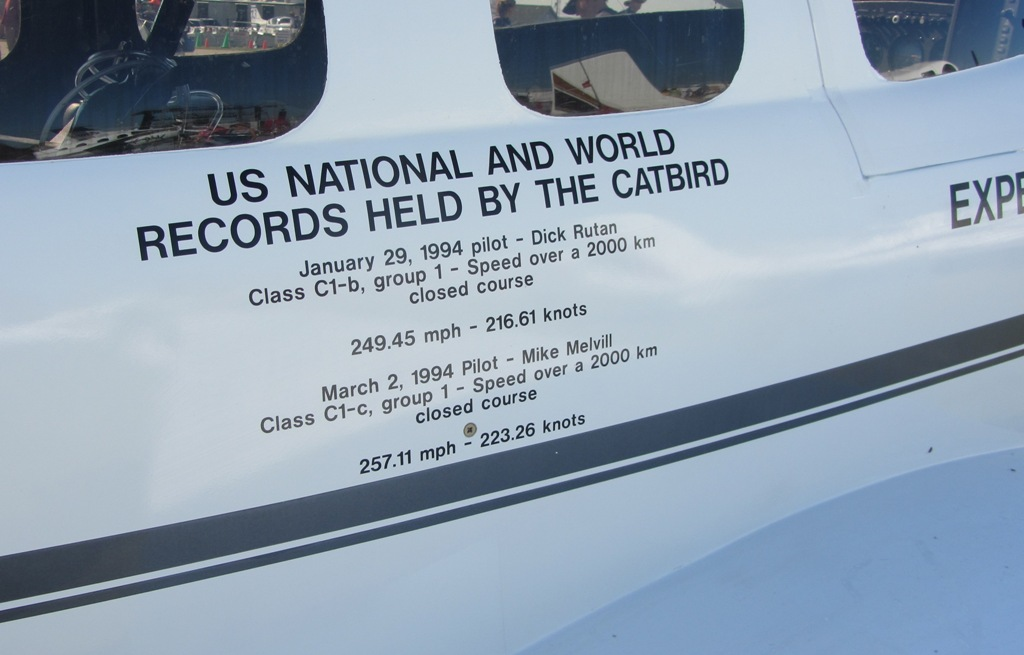

The Scaled Composites Model 81 Catbird is a high-efficiency five-seat single-engine all-composite general aviation aircraft designed by Burt Rutan. It is unusual in that it incorporates both a small forward wing and a small conventional horizontal stabilizer on the tail.

== Design and development ==
The Catbird was designed by Burt Rutan while his company, Scaled Composites, was owned by Beechcraft. The design was intended to replace the long-produced Bonanza. The financial situation of Beech at the time, and competing projects, prevented consideration of commercial production. In 1988 Beechcraft sold Scaled Composites to the partnership of Rutan and the Wyman-Gordon Company, who also acquired the rights to a number of the designs, including Model 81 Catbird.

The aircraft was stored inverted from the ceiling of Scaled Composites' Mojave hangar until April 2011. The aircraft was restored to flying condition by Zach Reeder, Jim Reed and Mike Melvill. Catbird's second first flight was July 7, 2011.

== World records ==
Catbird holds the world record for speed over a closed circuit of 5,000 km without payload of 334.44 km/h, set in 2014 in Category C-1c, Landplanes with take-off weights from 1000 to 1750 kg.

The aircraft won the CAFE Foundation's 1988 California CAFE 400 race flown by Mike Melvill, in which aircraft compete for performance efficiency, as measured by fuel consumption, speed and payload. Piloted by Dick Rutan, it subsequently won the 1993 CAFE Challenge with a record score and a speed of 210.73 mph (339.14 km/h), fuel consumption of 20.15 mpg (US miles and gallons) and a payload of 976.63 pounds (442.99 kg).

In 2014, the Catbird set another record, for speed over a closed 2,000 km course, from Mojave to EAA AirVenture Oshkosh, with an average speed of 339.50 km/h (211 mph).

== Specifications (Model 81 Catbird) ==
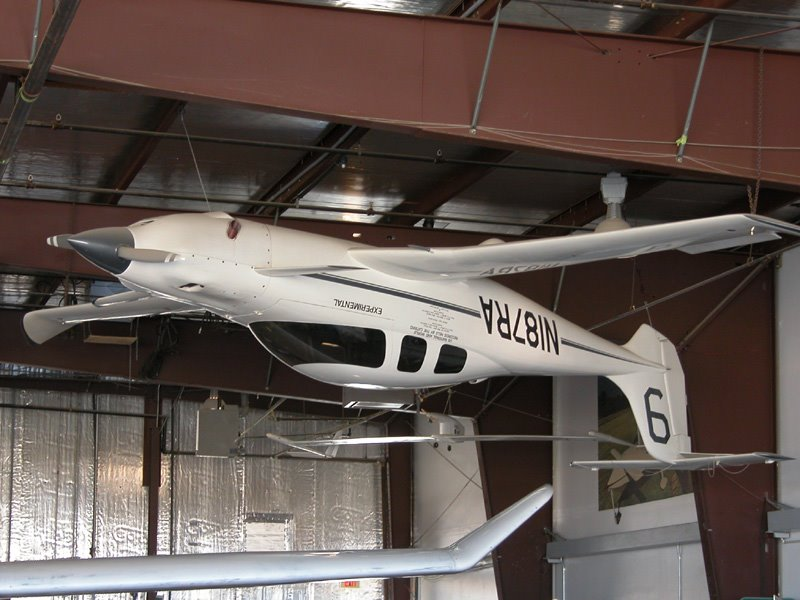
Catbird in storage

Data from EAA

General characteristics

- Crew: one
- Capacity: four passengers
- Powerplant: 1 × Lycoming TIO-360-C1A6D , 210 hp (160 kW)

Performance

- Maximum speed: 238 kn (274 mph, 441 km/h)
- Cruise speed: 218 kn (251 mph, 404 km/h)
- Rate of climb: 2,000 ft/min (10 m/s)

Avionics

- Northstar M1 Loran
