= Rutan VariEze =

Homebuilt aircraft designed by Burt Rutan

VariEze
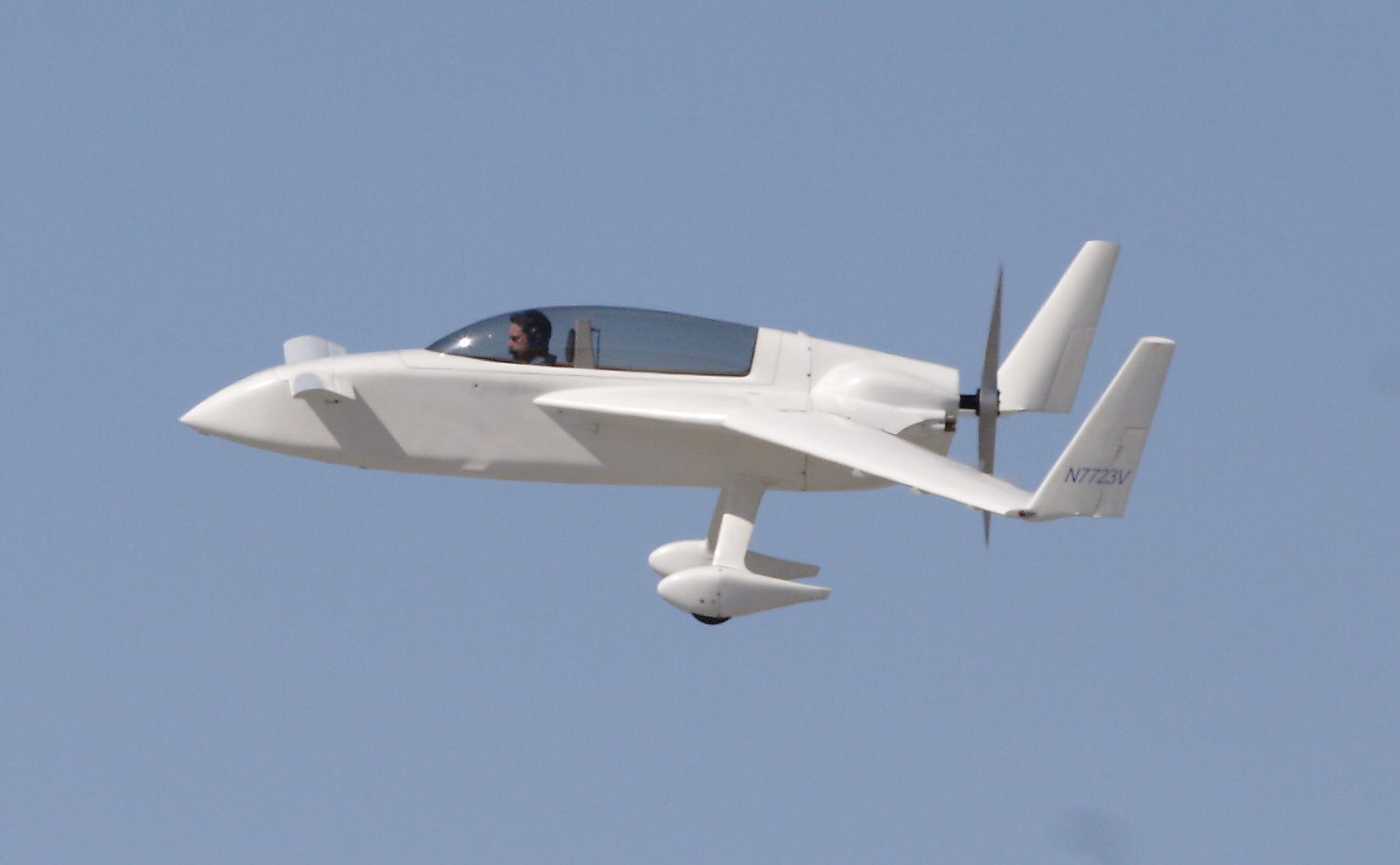

General information
- Type: Homebuilt aircraft
- National origin: United States of America
- Manufacturer: Rutan Aircraft Factory (plans supplier)
- Designer: Burt Rutan
- Number built: 400+ (1982)

History
- First flight: May 21, 1975

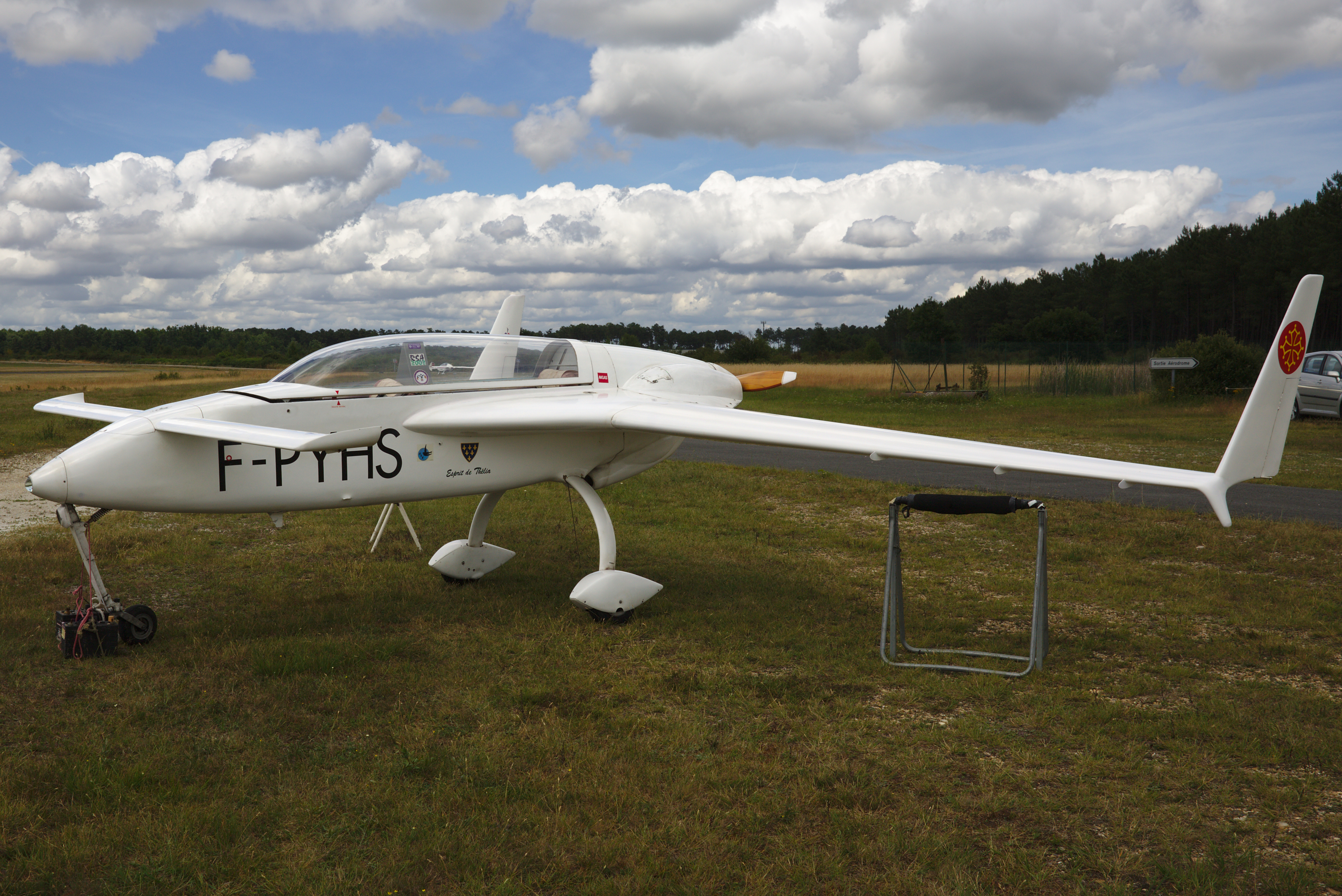
On the ground

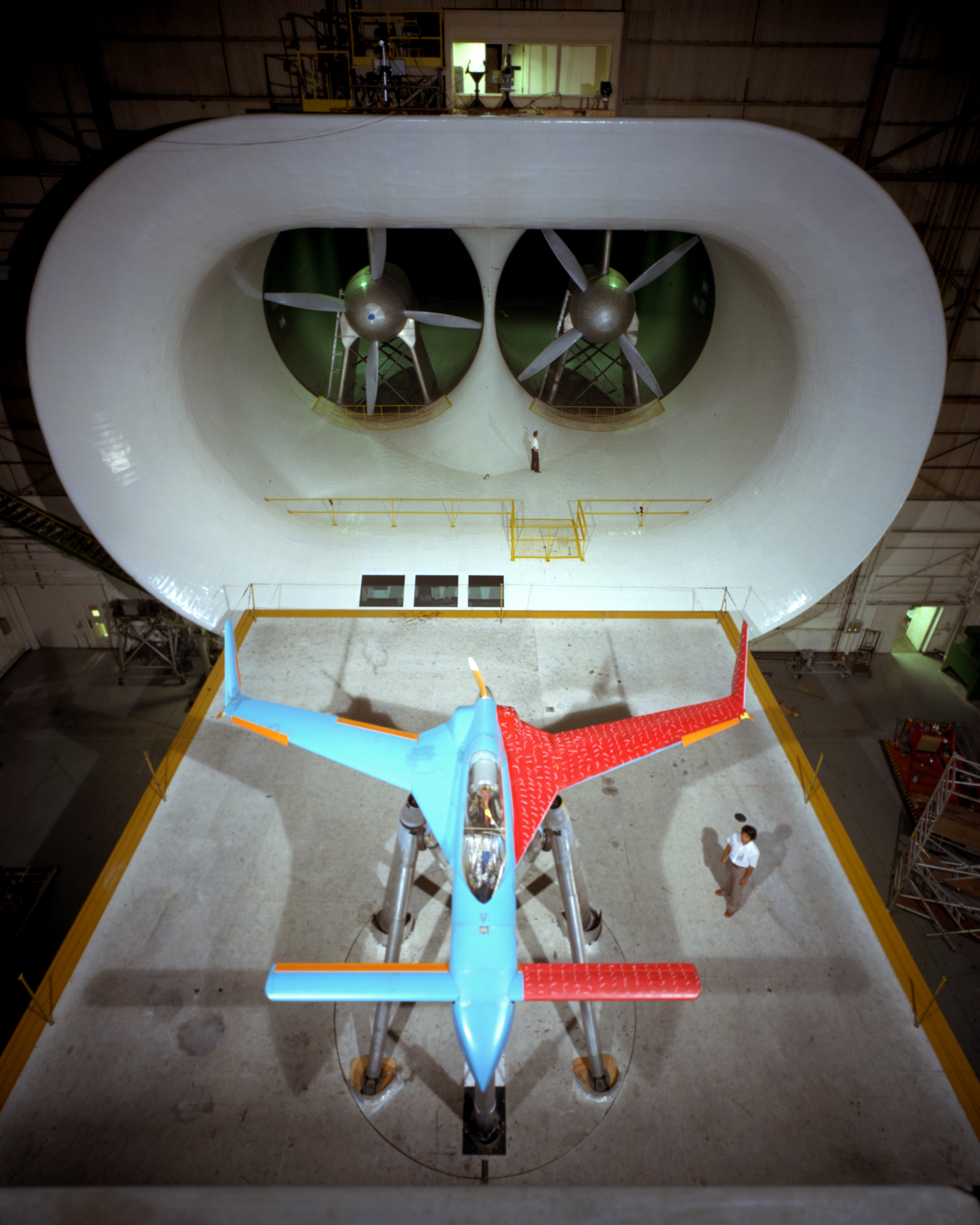
Langley wind tunnel

The Rutan VariEze is a composite, canard aircraft designed by Burt Rutan. It is a high-performance homebuilt aircraft, hundreds of which have been constructed. The design later evolved into the Long-EZ and other, larger cabin canard aircraft. The VariEze is notable for popularizing the canard configuration and moldless glass cloth composite construction for homebuilt aircraft.

== Overview ==
Work on the VariEze design, which grew out of Rutan's experience designing and building the VariViggen, began in 1974. The first prototype, designated Model 31 and registered N7EZ, first flew on May 21, 1975 after four months of construction. This aircraft used a Volkswagen engine conversion. Three months later it was shown at Oshkosh where Dick Rutan piloted it.

The aircraft was so popular at Oshkosh that Rutan redesigned the aircraft so that it could be sold as a set of plans. A second prototype, the Model 33, N4EZ, built using a larger wing, a Continental O-200 engine, and many other detail changes, was shown at Oshkosh in July 1976 and plans were offered for sale. Approximately 2000 aircraft were under construction by 1980, with about 300 flying by late 1980. Ultimately more VariEzes and Long-EZs (a derivative, slightly larger design) were constructed than any other homebuilt type of the time. The sale of plans ceased in 1985.

Rutan's stated goals for the design included reduced susceptibility to departure/spin and efficient long range cruise; these goals were achieved. The use of a canard configuration allowed a stall-resistant design, at the price of somewhat increased takeoff and landing speeds and distances relative to a similar conventional design with effective flaps. The holder of the CAFE Challenge aircraft efficiency prize briefly was Gary Hertzler, set using a VariEze.

The prototypes flew originally with elevons on the canard for both pitch and roll control but the design was changed to pitch control with the canard elevators and roll control with mid span wing ailerons after a few aircraft were built.

While the airplane was resistant to pitch departures, a few builders discovered a potential for a novel lateral departure mode resulting from one winglet stalling at large sideslip angles. An outer wing leading edge droop (and later vortilons on some examples) was added to alleviate this problem and rudder travel was reduced.

The design's stall resistance did not appear to translate to a lower accident rate than for other homebuilts; a review of the NTSB database from 1976 to 2005 shows 130 total accidents and 46 fatal accidents out of a fleet of about 800 (691 registered in 2005). Precise comparisons are difficult, however, because of the haphazard nature of data collection and analysis for accidents involving homebuilt airplanes.

The VariEze is subject to a 2.5g positive, 1.5g negative, maximum load factor limit applied after the discovery of problems with some VariEze wings.

In lieu of a parking brake, the nosewheel retracts and the nose rests on the ground. Referred to as kneeling, this eases access to the cockpit. Resting the nose on the ground also prevents the plane from tipping onto its rear when the pilot's seat is unoccupied.

== Specifications ==
Data from Jane's All The World's Aircraft 1982–83.

General characteristics

- Crew: 1
- Capacity: 1 passenger
- Length: 14 ft 2 in (4.27 m)
- Wingspan: 22 ft 2.5 in (6.77 m)
- Wing area: 53.6 sq ft (4.98 m^{2})
- Empty weight: 580 lb (263 kg)
- Max takeoff weight: 1,050 lb (476 kg)
- Fuel capacity: 24 US Gal (91 L)
- Powerplant: 1 × Continental O-200-B air-cooled flat-four engine, 100 hp (75 kW)

Performance

- Maximum speed: 195 mph (314 km/h, 169 kn) (max cruise)
- Cruise speed: 165 mph (266 km/h, 143 kn) (econ cruise)
- Stall speed: 55.5 mph (89.3 km/h, 48.2 kn)
- Range: 850 mi (1,370 km, 740 nmi) at econ cruise
- Rate of climb: 1,600 ft/min (8.1 m/s)

== See also ==
Related development

- Long-EZ
