= Scaled Composites Pond Racer =

Twin-engine twin-boom aircraft

Pond Racer
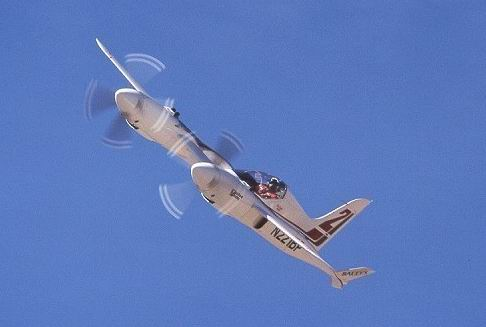

General information
- Type: Racing aircraft
- Manufacturer: Scaled Composites
- Designer: Burt Rutan
- Number built: 1
- Registration: N221BP

History
- Introduction date: 1991
- First flight: March 22, 1991
- Retired: September 14, 1993 (Destroyed)
- Fate: Destroyed

The Scaled Composites Pond Racer (Company designation Model 158) was a twin-engine twin-boom racing aircraft developed for Bob Pond by Burt Rutan and his company Scaled Composites.

== Reason for creation ==
Bob Pond commissioned the design with the idea of developing a modern aircraft that could compete with the vintage warbirds in the Unlimited Class at the Reno air races. Bob Pond was concerned that each year at the Reno Air Races, valuable and historic aircraft were being crashed and destroyed, not to mention many engines being damaged or wrecked beyond repair. The Pond Racer was hoped to be an alternative to vintage aircraft like the P-51 Mustang and the Hawker Sea Fury that would be as fast and spectacular in the air as the warbirds.

== Design ==
The airframe was constructed of composite materials, carbon fiber and Kevlar. This resulted in a very light, strong aircraft. To power the plane two Electramotive 3 liter V-6 engines were chosen. These were based on the Nissan VG30 automobile engine. The engines were originally developed for auto racing and were turbocharged to produce 1,000 hp (750 kW). However, those fitted to the Pond Racer only ever achieved a peak of around 600 hp (450 kW). The engines drove 4-bladed propellers via propeller speed reduction units.

== Aircraft debut ==
The aircraft made its debut at the 1991 Reno air races having been flown from the Scaled Composites factory under escort. Gasoline was used as the fuel for the flight to Reno as this gave a greater range. The onboard engine control computers were replaced with equipment for metering methanol in the race configuration. Methanol was the preferred fuel because no intercoolers were needed, and so the associated drag was eliminated. After the day's running had concluded, the engines were again configured to burn gasoline to preclude the corrosive effects of methanol. The aircraft was entered in the Silver class and qualified at 400 mph (640 km/h), flown by experienced test pilot Rick Brickert. The aircraft developed mechanical problems before the race was officially started and dropped out as a DNS.

The decision was made by Pond to attend Reno with the same engines used for flight testing. In fact, a vibrator was still attached to the left vertical stabilizer to initiate flutter as part of the planned flight test program. There was no expectation of victory the first year. It was viewed as a "dress rehearsal" more than anything else. After takeoff for the final event on Sunday, the left engine threw a rod out the side of the block and created a tunnel of fire 4 feet (1.2 m) in diameter and about 15 feet (4.6 m) long. An onboard halon extinguishing system put the oil fire out and an uneventful single-engine landing was made. The engine installations were very compact and "close cowled", meaning the bodywork covering the engines had little clearance. The carbon fiber engine cowling was a structural component of the aircraft and as such had to be protected from heat-soak after shutdown. This was accomplished via two 2-stroke weed blowers immediately after the blades stopped turning, quickly followed by two air conditioner blowers attached to the air inlet "scuppers". The engine cowlings were lined with corrugated inconel of .007 thickness. Airflow was vital to structural integrity. Conversely, the powerplant units had to be preheated to nearly operating temperature before fireup. This was due to the tight tolerances of the engine main bearings. Because methanol burns much cooler than gasoline, cooling was never an issue. Actually the cold nature of the methanol gave the team a problem with oil viscosity. The thick, graphite laden oil would "puke" overboard for the majority of the time while airborne. Eventually it was determined that the oil drain holes were undersized in the rocker area of the heads as they were not intended to run at a constant high RPM in an automobile application. At race speeds, the engines were turning 8000 RPM, geared down to 2000 at the prop, the engines were expected to run at this level for the 15 minutes of the race. Fully half of the radiator inlet ducting was blocked off after the first test flight on March 22, 1991. Dick Rutan was the initial test pilot. Mike Melvill also flew the plane as did Steve Hinton as part of the test program.

== Problems and loss ==
On September 14, 1993, the Pond Racer was entered again and once more, piloted by Rick Brickert. During qualifying, the aircraft began leaking oil and suffered an engine failure leaving the right propeller unfeathered. Brickert pulled up, lowered the landing gear, and chose to perform a belly landing by retracting the gear again. The aircraft overshot a smooth landing area and crashed in rough terrain, killing the pilot.

== Specifications (Performance 1991 Reno meeting) ==
Data from Unfulfilled Promises

General characteristics

- Crew: 1
- Length: 20 ft 0 in (6.10 m)
- Wingspan: 25 ft 4 3/4 in (7.741 m)
- Empty weight: 3,500 lb (1,588 kg)
- Gross weight: 4,140 lb (1,878 kg)
- Powerplant: 2 × Electramotive VG-30 , 600 hp (450 kW) each

Performance

- Maximum speed: 400.0 mph (643.8 km/h, 347.6 kn)
