= Rutan SkiGull =

American amphibious aircraft

SkiGull
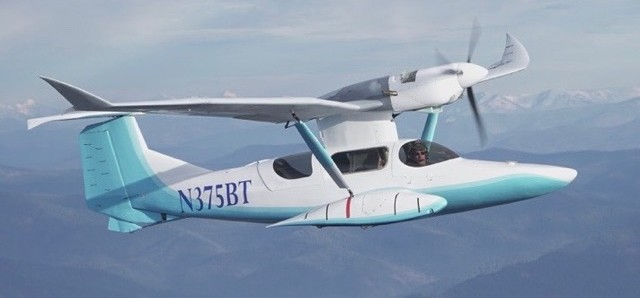
- SkiGull on its maiden flight, with the skis retracted.

General information
- Type: Amphibious
- National origin: United States
- Designer: Burt Rutan
- Status: In development
- Number built: 1

History
- First flight: November 2015

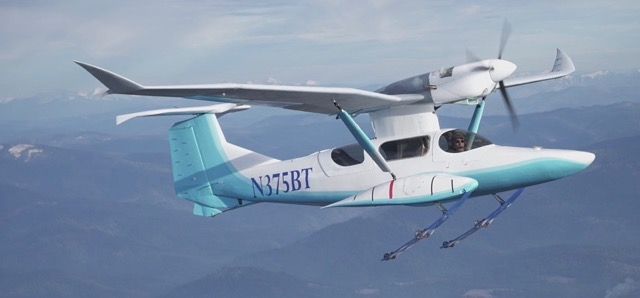
SkiGull on its maiden flight, with the skis extended.

The Rutan SkiGull is an amphibious aircraft designed by Burt Rutan.

== Development ==
The SkiGull is a two-seat composite/titanium aircraft equipped with retractable ski undercarriage that can have wheels attached for water, snow or land operations, landing on around 400 feet of surface, but with a range to cross oceans. The engine is configured to operate with Swift Fuel, auto or boat fuel. The aircraft is being developed privately.

Public disclosure of the SkiGull design was made at the EAA's Airventure convention in 2015. Details included ability to operate in ocean waves with skis or land on smooth water or grass with skis retracted, 140 knot cruise speed (optionally 177 knots turbocharged), quiet flight, water takeoff in 460 feet, high wing with 47-foot span (foldable), ground transportation without a trailer, a single 44-percent-span Fowler flap behind the main propeller, and two electric motors with forward-folding reversible propellers to simplify docking and give optional takeoff power.

The SkiGull performed water tests in October 2015. It has two 12 hp electric motors for docking, but they can also fly the plane 8 miles without the piston engine. The plane can loiter for 35 hours. First flight tests in Coeur d'Alene, Idaho lasting 1.8 hours were successfully completed November 24, 2015. Tests included basic stability and control in cruise configuration and with flap down and skis extended. Rutan states that his goal for the aircraft is "something that we'll look back and say, 'what this airplane is and is able to do, in terms of operating in beaches, rough water, and have the kind of capabilities that it has, is not just something a little better than the best floatplane, but something that is really truly breakthrough in nature.'"

Ongoing work is addressing refinements such as stall characteristics and pitch attitude in water. Changes also include larger wheels functionally independent of the skis and no longer configured as a "tail dragger."

== Specifications (SkiGull) ==
Data from AVweb

General characteristics

- Crew: one
- Capacity: one passenger
- Wingspan: 47 ft (14 m)
- Powerplant: 1 × Rotax 912iS air and liquid-cooled, horizontally opposed piston aircraft engine, 100 hp (75 kW)
- Powerplant: 2 × electric motors , 12 hp (8.9 kW) each

Performance

- Cruise speed: 170 kn (200 mph, 310 km/h)

== See also ==
- Scaled Composites - Company founded by Rutan
