= Scaled Composites Model 367 BiPod =

Experimental flying car

General information
- Type: Roadable aircraft
- National origin: United States of America
- Manufacturer: Scaled Composites
- Designer: Burt Rutan

The Scaled Composites Model 367 BiPod is an experimental flying car developed by Scaled Composites. It was the final aircraft designed by Burt Rutan prior to his retirement.

== Development ==
The Bipod was originally designed to be an electric propulsion testbed, later evolving into the flying car concept. The vehicle was constructed for market evaluation and testing only. No flight testing was planned, or done, on the single prototype built.

== Design ==
The BiPod uses twin fuselages joined by a wing surface. Each fuselage has tandem wheels. The wings, stabilizers and tail tips are removable for road operations. The BiPod is driven as a car from the cockpit in the left-hand fuselage; and flown as an aircraft from the cockpit in the right-hand fuselage. The wings can be carried between the two fuselage sections during road operation. The wingspan of nearly 32 feet (9.8 m) is reduced to 7.9 feet (2.4 m) when the wings are removed. The vehicle can be parked in a regular-sized garage stall when the wings and tail surfaces have been removed.

=== Propulsion ===
Each fuselage section has a 450cc gasoline engine, which drives an electric generator. The generators power 15 kW electric motors; two such motors drive the rear wheels for land use, and four such motors drive four propellers (two on the horizontal stabilizer and two on the wings). Although not installed to date as of July 2011, the testbed configuration will eventually incorporate rechargeable lithium batteries for additional power during takeoff or for extra climb performance. In addition, as of the first flight the propellers and propeller drive motors had not been installed; the "flights" consisted of brief hops above a runway after the drive wheels had been used to accelerate the vehicle to 80 mph (130 km/h).

== Operational history ==
The prototype was built in four months. In July 2011, Aviation Week and Space Technology reported that "In anticipation of Rutan's retirement, Scaled Composite employees scrambled to get the new design flying in March of this year, only four months after its preliminary design phase." Test hops have been performed with the prototype at Mojave Air and Space Port using propulsion from the wheels. The vehicle has been ground tested up to 80 mph. No flight testing is planned.

== Specifications ==
Data from Aviation Week and Space Technology.

General characteristics

- Crew: 1
- Capacity: 2
- Wingspan: 31 ft 10 in (9.70 m) 7 ft 11 in roadable configuration.
- Gross weight: 1,430 lb (649 kg)1.2kwh lithium battery

Performance

- Maximum speed: 170 kn (200 mph, 320 km/h)
- Range: 460 nmi (530 mi, 850 km) 760 miles at 100 mph in air, 820 miles on land, 35 miles on land with battery
