= Mike Melvill =

South African-born American test pilot and astronaut (1940–2026)

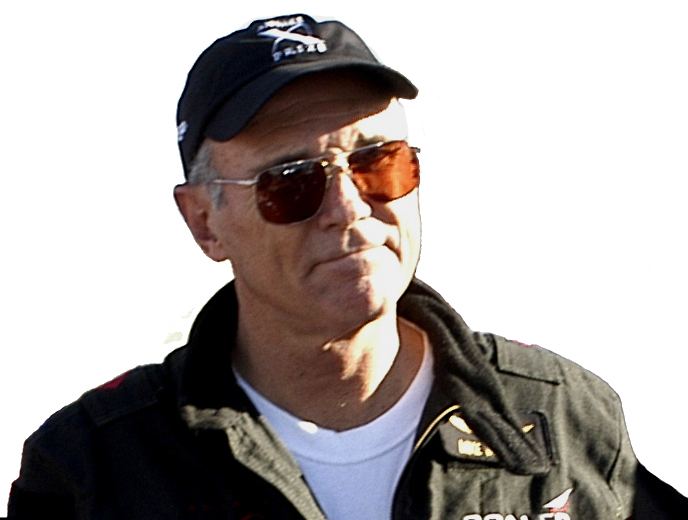
- Melvill in 2004
- Born: Michael Winston Melvill; November 30, 1940; Johannesburg, South Africa
- Died: March 19, 2026 (aged 85)
- Education: Hilton College
- Occupation: Test pilot
- Space career

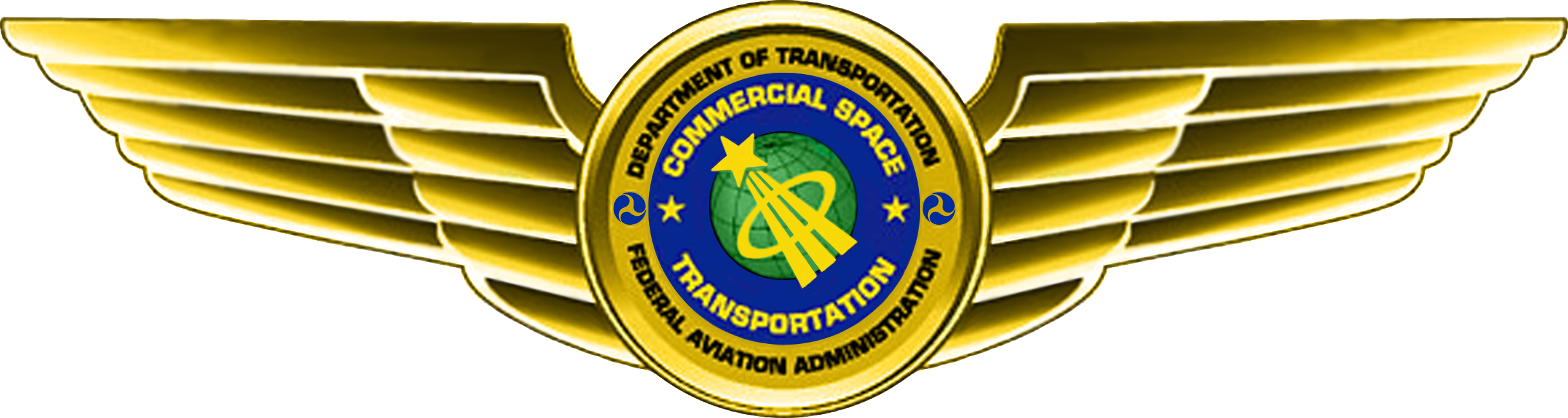
Commercial astronaut
- Time in space: 7 mins (roughly estimated)
- Selection: SpaceShipOne 2003
- Missions: SpaceShipOne flight 15P, SpaceShipOne flight 16P

Michael Winston Melvill (November 30, 1940 – March 19, 2026) was a South African-born American world-record-breaking pilot and one of the test pilots for SpaceShipOne, the experimental spaceplane developed by Scaled Composites. Melvill piloted SpaceShipOne on its first flight past the edge of space, flight 15P on June 21, 2004, thus becoming the first commercial astronaut, and the 435th person to go into space. He was also the pilot on SpaceShipOne's flight 16P, the first competitive flight in the Ansari X Prize competition.

== Life and career ==
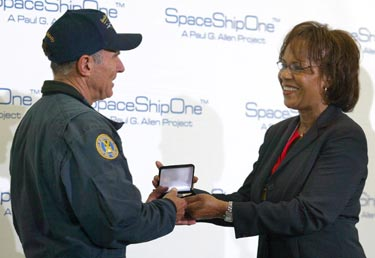
Melvill receiving wings as the first commercial astronaut in history

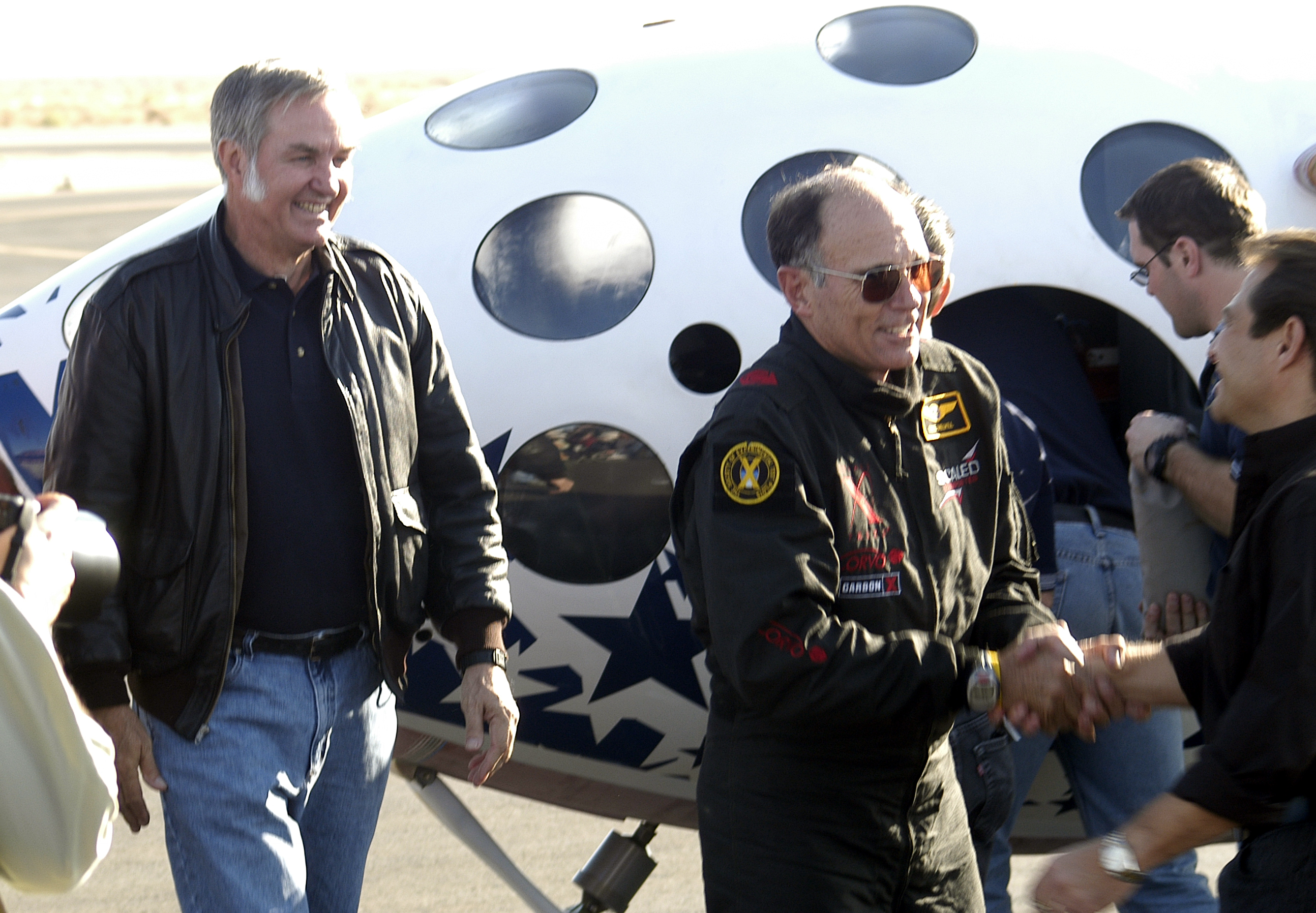
Melvill (right) and Burt Rutan (left) in front of SpaceShipOne

Michael Winston Melvill was born in Johannesburg, South Africa on November 30, 1940.

In 1978, Melvill met aerospace designer and Scaled Composites founder Burt Rutan when he flew to California to show Rutan the VariViggen he had built at his home. Rutan then hired him on the spot. In 1982, he was named Rutan's lead test pilot.

Melvill was a founding member of the team that made the Rutan Voyager around the world aircraft. He was the only person other than Voyager's crew, Dick Rutan and Jeana Yeager, to have flown the aircraft.

In 1997, Melvill and Dick Rutan, Burt's brother, flew two Long-EZ aircraft that they built side-by-side around the world. This "around the world in 80 nights" flight was called The Spirit of EAA Friendship World Tour, and some legs of it lasted for over 14 hours.

His famous 2004 flights in SpaceshipOne earned him and the entire project team the Ansari X Prize of $10 million and helped spur the beginning of the global private space race.

Later in his career, he became Vice President/General Manager at Scaled Composites.

He held FAA Commercial certificate, ASEL, AMEL, instrument airplane, rotorcraft-helicopter, glider and then astronaut.

Melvill died on March 19, 2026, at the age of 85.

== Awards and achievements ==
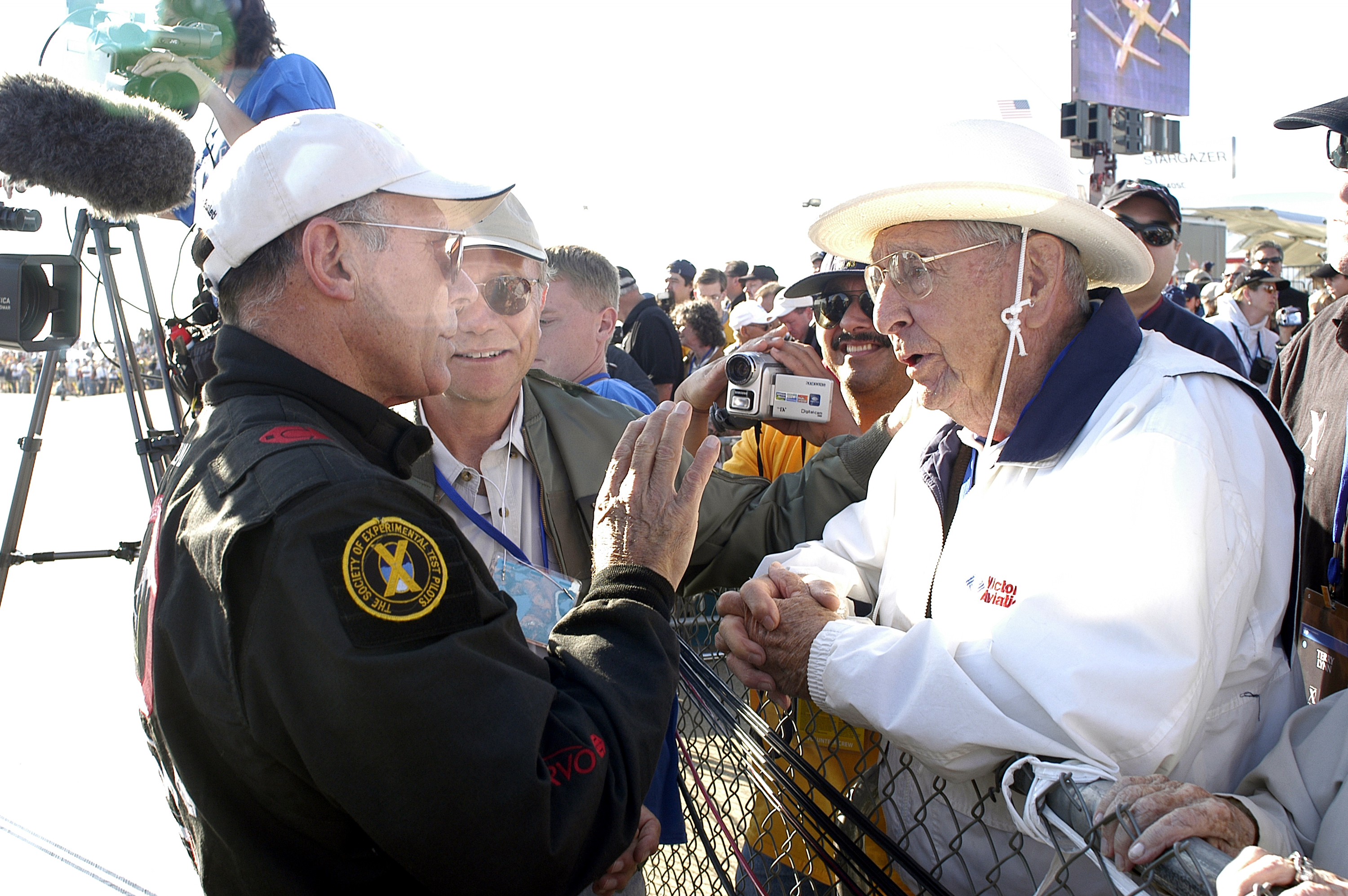
Melvill reviews the first private space flight with Scott Crossfield

As of January 2020, Melvill was the sole or joint holder of ten FAI aviation world records in various categories.

Melvill was awarded the Iven C. Kincheloe Award in 1999 for high altitude, developmental flight-testing of the model 281 Proteus aircraft.

Through SpaceShipOne flight 15P in 2004, he was known as the first privately funded human spaceflight mission pilot to reach space.
