= CAFE Foundation =

American non-profit organization

The CAFE Foundation is a U.S. non-profit aviation development and flight test organization based in Windsor, California. CAFE was an acronym for "Competition in Aircraft Flight Efficiency" and became later "Comparative Aircraft Flight Efficiency." The organization promotes experimental aviation activities which promote the development of highly efficient aircraft. It is sponsored by many organizations including Boeing Phantom Works, NASA, EAA, AOPA, Glasair Aviation, among others; and funding is also obtained through an FAA grant.

== CAFE 400 ==
The CAFE Foundation is an outgrowth from activities sponsored by the Experimental Aircraft Association (EAA) Chapter 124 in Santa Rosa, California. In the late 1970s, races were held at the annual EAA AirVenture Oshkosh airshow in Oshkosh, Wisconsin, in which the goal was to fly the most fuel-efficient general aviation aircraft. From the early races, as the Lowers-Backer-Falk competition (or Oshkosh 500 races), the CAFE Formula evolved to better evaluate the aircraft efficiency. The start formula was V x MPG x W, later V^1.25 x MPG x W^0.75, where V = average speed over the course of the race, MPG = miles per US gallon of fuel and W = cabin payload in pounds. The first regular races to use this formula were the CAFE 250, then CAFE 400, which were held each summer from 1981 to 1990 and carried a purse of $2,000.

== CAFE triaviathon ==
In 1986, the Foundation utilized a newly developed, ultra-sensitive airspeed sensor, called the CAFE Barograph and inaugurated the CAFE Triaviathon race. This race evaluated an aircraft based on top speed, stall speed and rate of climb. Because of the barograph's sensitivity, the FAA later designated it as the standard for use during aircraft certification flight tests. The CAFE 400 and Triaviathon races were discontinued after the 1990 season

== Flight test program ==
After the 1990 season, the focus of the Foundation shifted to performing detailed flight test analyses of experimental aircraft, again focusing on the aircraft's efficiency. Each aircraft evaluated resulted in an Aircraft Performance Report that was then published by the EAA. These activities took place at a new facility, the CAFE Flight Test Center, at the Sonoma County Airport, funded by the EAA and completed in 1993.

== CAFE challenge ==
In that same year, a new race, the CAFE Challenge, was inaugurated, and the Triaviathon was reinstated. Using highly accurate GPS technology, the Challenge used the slightly modified CAFE Formula over a 500-mile (800 km) closed course to evaluate an aircraft's performance. The Formula is V^1.3 x MPG x W^0.6, where V = average speed over the course of the race, MPG = miles per US gallon of fuel and W = cabin payload in pounds. The first winner of the Challenge was the Scaled Composites Catbird, a high-performance single-engine all-composite aircraft designed by Burt Rutan and flown by his brother, Dick Rutan in 1993. The 1994 winner of the Challenge was another composite aircraft of canard layout designed by Burt Rutan and flown by Gary Hertzler. Rather than a monetary purse, the two races now are commemorated by a perpetual trophy.

== NASA-funded challenges ==
Beginning in 2008, the Challenge race was recast. NASA has funded a purse of $300,000, to be distributed over several prizes, including the Community Noise Prize, the "Green Prize", which measures fuel efficiency, the Aviation Safety Prize, for aircraft handling qualities, a reinstatement of the CAFE 400 race, and the "Quietest LSA" Prize. In addition, NASA had put up $2 million in prize funding to encourage the development of the Personal Air Vehicle.

=== Green Flight Challenge ===
The 2011 NASA-CAFE Green Flight Challenge requires participants to fly 200 miles (320 km) in under 2 hours, and doing it at less than 1-US-gallon (3.8 L) of gasoline per occupant. Nine teams have registered.

== Other activities ==
The CAFE Foundation also hosts an annual symposium which focuses on research subjects that affect the development of more efficient aircraft.
