= Departure resistance =

Characteristic of aircraft

Departure resistance is a quality of an aircraft which enables it to remain in controlled flight and resist entering potentially dangerous less-controlled maneuvers such as spin.

Depending on its design, an aircraft may be more or less likely to leave (depart from) controlled flight when the pilot applies extreme control inputs. Good departure resistance characteristics allow the pilot to remain in control of the aircraft in such situations.

Departure resistance is considered to contribute more towards flight safety than departure recovery. Departure recovery is the ability of an aircraft to return to controlled flight once in a certain uncontrolled maneuver. Being able to recover from spin is an example of departure recovery.
