= Rutan VariViggen =

Homebuilt aircraft designed by Burt Rutan

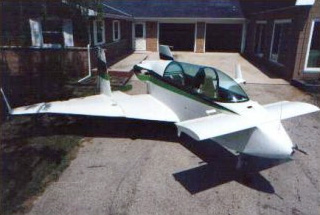

General information
- Type: Homebuilt light aircraft
- Manufacturer: Rutan Aircraft Factory (plans supplier)
- Designer: Burt Rutan
- Status: < 5 flying
- Primary user: private owners
- Number built: ~20

History
- First flight: April, 1972
- Variant: VariEze

The Rutan VariViggen is a homebuilt aircraft designed by Burt Rutan. The aircraft is a tandem two-seater of primarily wooden construction with a delta wing and a canard foreplane. The VariViggen is powered by a 150 hp Lycoming O-320 aero engine in pusher configuration. The prototype was designated Model 27, and the production version was Model 32.

== Design and development ==
The VariViggen was named after the Swedish fighter plane, the Saab 37 Viggen. This and the XB-70 Valkyrie inspired the design. Rutan became interested in aircraft which resisted stalls and spins, and the VariViggen was his first full scale design. He began working with the design as a student at Cal Poly in the early 1960s, and started building the prototype in his garage in 1968. After four years of work, the aircraft made its first flight in April, 1972. In order to increase efficiency, the Model 32 (also known as the VariViggen SP) had a slightly longer fuselage, a larger wingspan and winglets.

The Rutan Aircraft Factory sold 600 plan sets for the VariViggen to homebuilders, and eventually about 20 of the aircraft were built. Following the crash of one in New Brunswick, Canada in September 2006 due to wing tank fuel contamination, and only one is still currently flying. The prototype aircraft, N27VV, can be seen in the 1975 movie Death Race 2000 and was eventually donated to the EAA AirVenture Museum in 1988.

Rutan also began work on an all-aluminum variant, the MiniViggen, but later abandoned the project and focused his efforts on the VariEze.

== VariViggen Model 27 Specifications (Standard Wing) ==
Data from Jane's All the World's Aircraft 1976–77

General characteristics

- Crew: 1
- Capacity: 1 passenger
- Length: 19 ft 0 in (5.79 m)
- Wingspan: 19 ft 0 in (5.79 m)
- Wing area: 119 sq ft (11.1 m^{2})
- Aspect ratio: 3.03
- Empty weight: 950 lb (431 kg)
- Max takeoff weight: 1,700 lb (771 kg)
- Fuel capacity: 30 US gal (25 imp gal; 110 L) (Note: 5 US Gal Reserve).
- Powerplant: 1 × Lycoming O-320-A2A air-cooled flat-four, 150 hp (110 kW)
- Propellers: 2-bladed Hegy wooden fixed-pitch, 5 ft 10 in (1.78 m) diameter

Performance

- Maximum speed: 163 mph (262 km/h, 142 kn)
- Cruise speed: 150 mph (240 km/h, 130 kn) 125mph (econ cruise at 7,000 ft (2,100 m))
- Never exceed speed: 180 mph (290 km/h, 160 kn)
- Range: 300–440 mi (480–710 km, 260–380 nmi) (max fuel, 30 minutes reserve).
- Service ceiling: 14,000 ft (4,300 m)
- Rate of climb: 800 ft/min (4.1 m/s)
- Take-off run to 50 ft (15 m): 950 ft (290 m)
- Landing run from 50 ft (15 m): 600 ft (180 m)
