= WK1 =

WK1 may refer to:

- Scaled Composites White Knight, also known as WhiteKnightOne (WK1)
- Wrestle Kingdom 1 at January_4_Dome_Show#Wrestle_Kingdom_in_Tokyo_Dome
- .wk1 file extension of Lotus 1-2-3
