= Scaled Composites White Knight Two =

SpaceShipTwo mother ship

White Knight Two
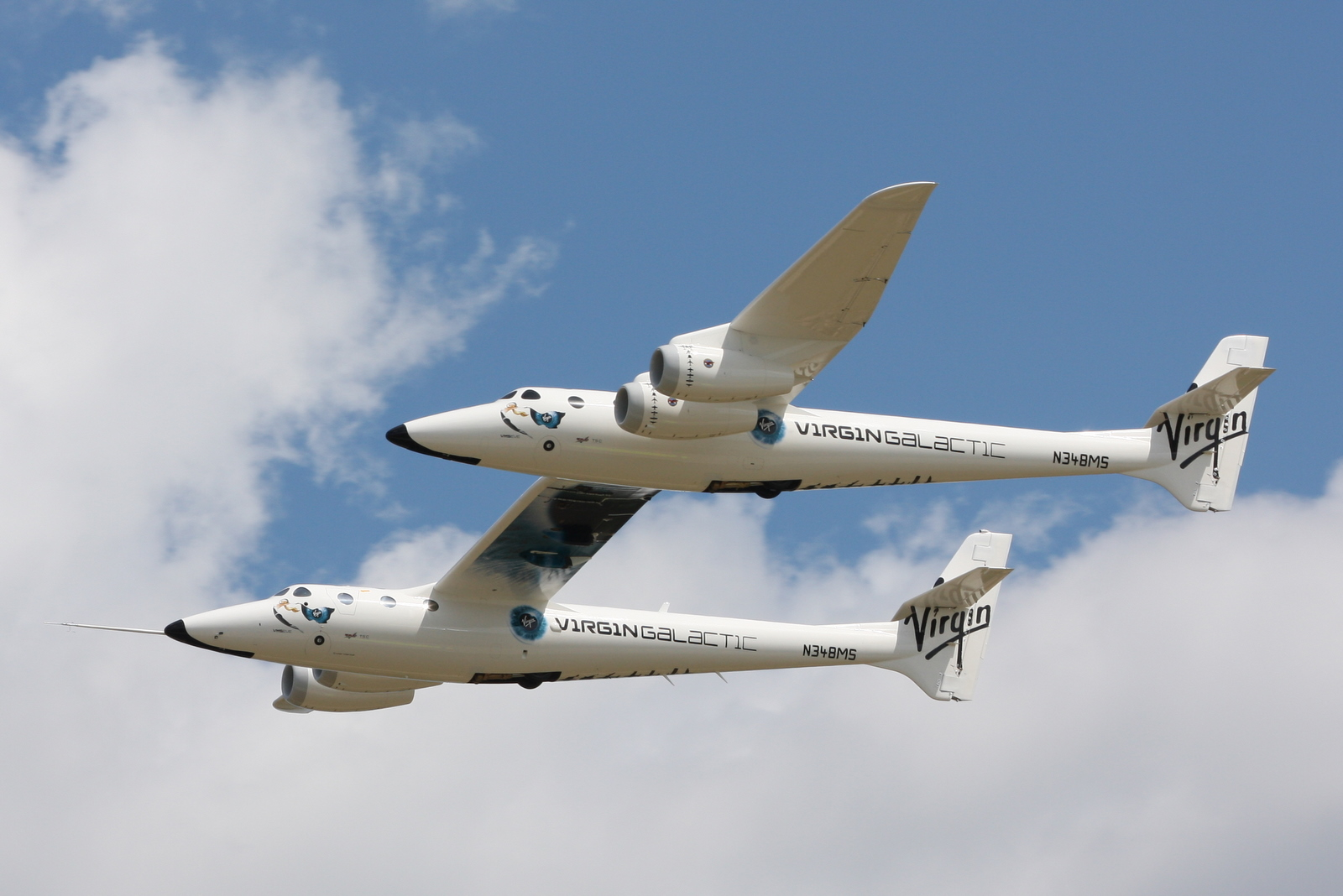

General information
- Type: Flying Spaceplane Carrier
- Manufacturer: Scaled Composites
- Designer: Robert Morgan, James Tighe
- Number built: 1

History
- First flight: December 28, 2008; 17 years ago
- Developed from: Scaled Composites White Knight

The Scaled Composites Model 348 White Knight Two (WK2) is a quadjet cargo aircraft that was used to lift the SpaceShipTwo (SS2) spacecraft to release altitude. It was developed by Scaled Composites from 2007 to 2010 as the first stage of Tier 1b, a two-stage to suborbital-space crewed launch system. WK2 is based on the mothership to SpaceShipOne, White Knight, which itself was based on Proteus.

The aircraft was designed for multi-purpose use, with an "open architecture" intended to enable it to operate as a zero-g aircraft for passenger training or microgravity science flights, to perform other high-altitude testing missions, or to launch payloads other than SpaceShipTwo. Another idea is to add a carbon-composite water tank to make it a forest fire water bomber.

The first White Knight Two was unveiled on July 28, 2008, and first flew on December 21, 2008; it is named VMS Eve after Richard Branson's mother Eve Branson. The second was expected to be named VMS Spirit of Steve Fossett after Branson's close friend Steve Fossett, who died in an aircraft accident in 2007. As of 2024, it was not clear whether SS2 and WK2 vehicles beyond VSS Enterprise, VSS Unity and VMS Eve will be built.

== History ==
In 2008, Virgin Galactic ordered two White Knight Two vehicles. Together, WK2 and SS2 were to form the basis for Virgin Galactic's fleet of suborbital spaceplanes.

In November 2010, The Spaceship Company announced that it planned to build at least three more White Knight Two aircraft plus five SpaceShipTwo rocket planes. The aircraft were to be built by Virgin after the initial prototypes of each craft are built by Scaled Composites.

During 2012 through 2014, Virgin Galactic was also considering using White Knight Two as the air-launch platform for a new two-stage liquid-fueled rocket small satellite launcher called LauncherOne. By late 2015, they decided to use a larger carrier aircraft for the job.

== Design ==
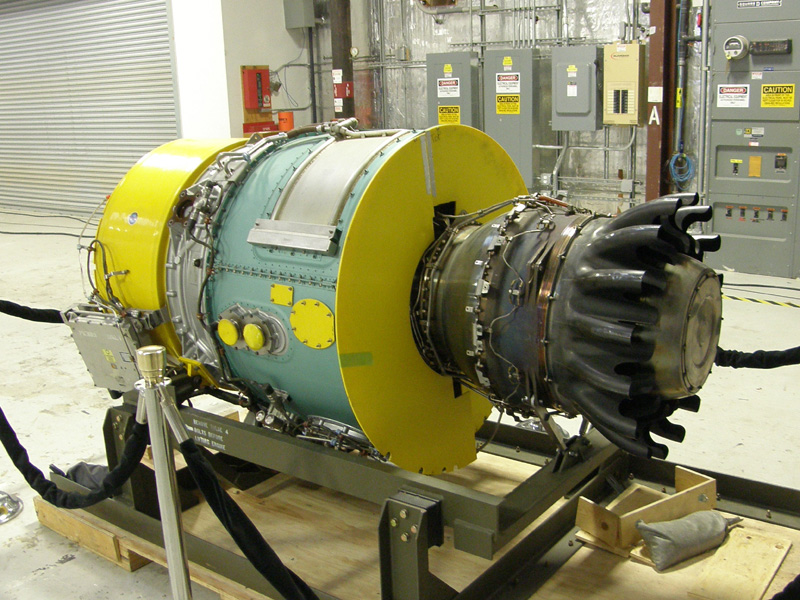
PW308 used on the White Knight Two

White Knight Two is roughly three times larger than White Knight in order to perform a captive flight with the larger SpaceShipTwo spacecraft. The WK2 is similar in wingspan to a Boeing B-29 Superfortress (141 ft 3 in (43.05 m)). White Knight Two is a modern aircraft, as even the flight control cables are constructed of carbon fiber, using a new patented design.

WK2 was planned to provide preview flights offering several seconds of weightlessness before the suborbital event. It was intended to have a service ceiling of about 60,000 ft (18 km), offering a dark blue sky to passengers. This would have allowed tourists to practice before the real flight.

White Knight Two is of twin fuselage design with four jet engines mounted two on each wing. One fuselage was planned to be an exact replica of that of SpaceShipTwo (to allow tourist training), and the other was planned to offer 'cut-rate' trips to the stratosphere.

The design is quite different from the White Knight, both in size, use of tail, engine configuration and placement of cockpit(s). The White Knight used two T-tails, but the White Knight Two uses two cruciform tails. Engine configuration is also very different. White Knight Two has four engines hung underneath the wings on pylons while White Knight's pair of engines were on either side of its single fuselage.

== Timeline of introduction ==
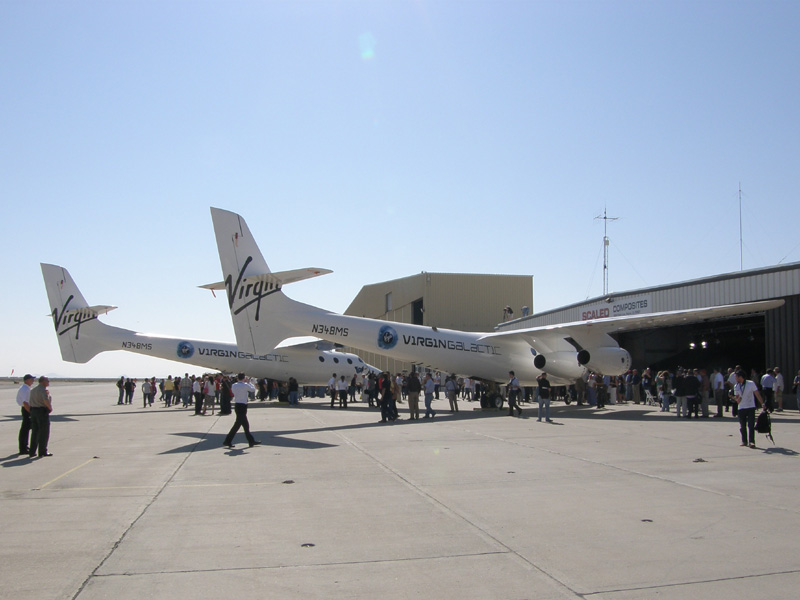
White Knight Two at its rollout and christening ceremony on July 28, 2008

Virgin Galactic contracted aerospace designer Burt Rutan to build the mothership and spacecraft.

On January 23, 2008 the White Knight Two design was revealed. On July 28, 2008 the completion and rollout of the first aircraft, Eve, (Tail Number: N348MS) occurred at Scaled's Mojave headquarters. Branson predicted that the maiden space voyage would take place in 18 months: "It represents... the chance for our ever-growing group of future astronauts and other scientists to see our world in a completely new light."

On March 22, 2010 the VMS Eve completed its 25th flight, the first occasion it carried a SpaceShipTwo, VSS Enterprise. In a flight of 2 hours 54 minutes, it ascended to an altitude of 45,000 ft (14,000 m).

The launch customer of White Knight Two was Virgin Galactic, which was planned to have the first two units, and exclusive rights to the craft for the first few years.

=== Flight test program ===
An extensive flight test program of VMS Eve, with nearly twenty flights between December 2008 and August 2009, was undertaken to validate the design and gradually expand the aircraft operating envelope. The flight tests were complete by September 2009, and testing with SpaceShipTwo began in early 2010.

== Aircraft specifications ==
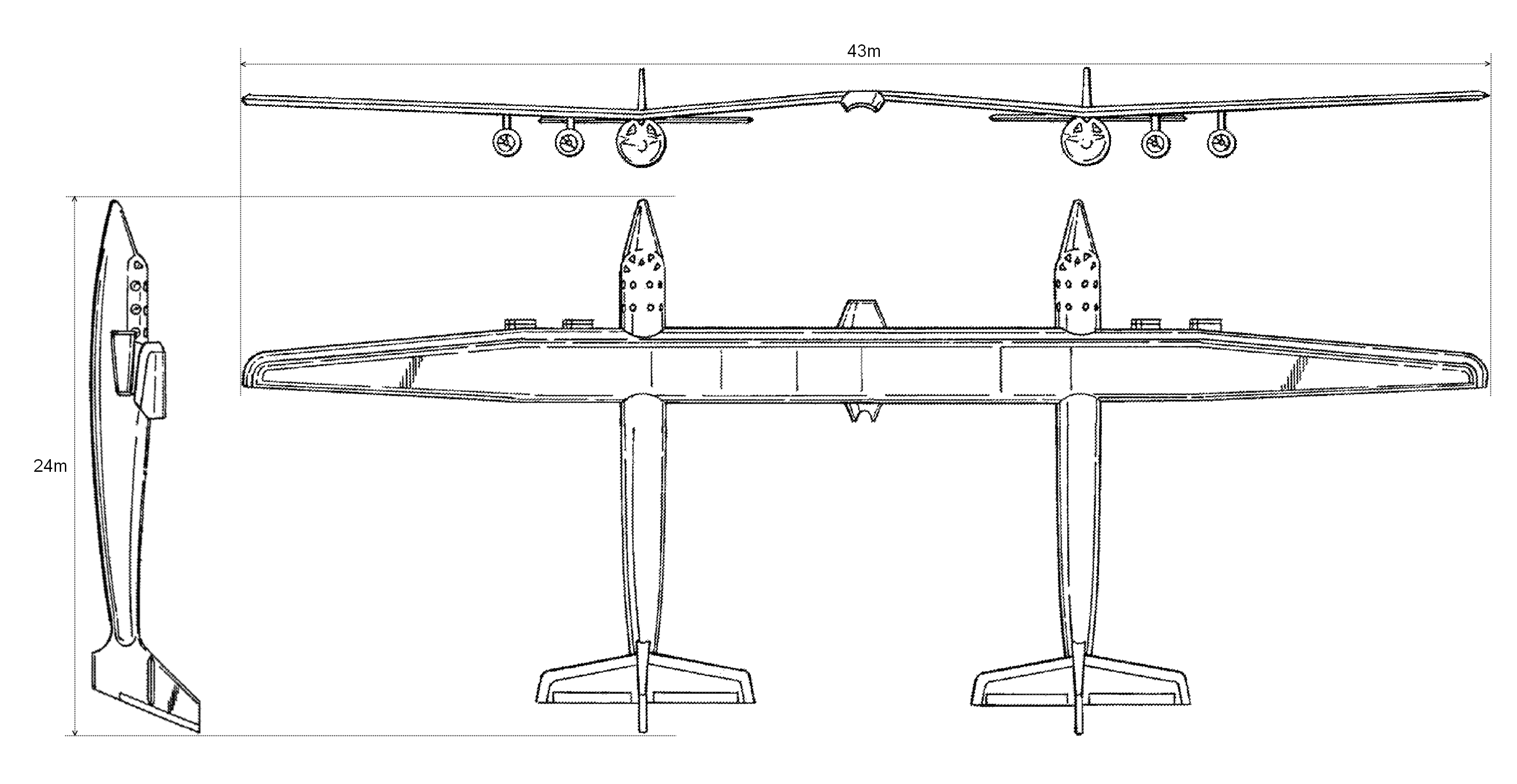

Data from Virgin Galactic Presentation 2007

General characteristics

- Crew: 2 (flight crew) + spaceship launch crew
- Capacity: payload 17,000 kg (37,479 lb) to 50,000 ft (15,240 m). Planned 200 kg satellite to LEO when carrying a LauncherOne orbital launch vehicle (White Knight Two never carried a LauncherOne rocket on an orbital space launch mission, so this payload figure is theoretical).
- Length: 78 ft 9 in (24 m)
- Wingspan: 141 ft 1 in (43 m)
- Powerplant: 4 × Pratt & Whitney Canada PW308 turbofan engines, 6,900 lbf (30.69 kN) thrust each

Performance

- Service ceiling: 70,000 ft (21,300 m)

== See also ==
- Scaled Composites Proteus, predecessor to WhiteKnightOne
- Scaled Composites Stratolaunch Roc, derivative of WhiteKnightTwo
- SpaceShipTwo, payload for WhiteKnightTwo
- WhiteKnightOne, predecessor to WhiteKnightTwo
