= 13P =

13P may refer to:

- SpaceShipOne flight 13P, a flight of SpaceShip One
- 13P/Olbers, a comet

== See also ==
- P13 (disambiguation)
