= Northrop Grumman E-10 MC2A =

Proposed Airborne Warning and Control aircraft based on the Boeing 767 airframe

E-10 MC2A

General information
- Type: Multi-Sensor Command and Control (MC2A): Airborne Early Warning and Control (AEW&C), Reconnaissance, Airborne Battle Management and ISTAR
- National origin: United States
- Manufacturer: Northrop Grumman
- Status: Cancelled
- Primary user: United States Air Force

History
- Developed from: Boeing 767

The Northrop Grumman E-10 MC2A was planned as a multi-role military aircraft to replace the Boeing 707-based E-3 Sentry and E-8 Joint STARS, the Boeing 747-based E-4B, and the RC-135 Rivet Joint aircraft in US military service. The E-10 was based on the Boeing 767-400ER commercial airplane.

== Development ==
In 2003, the Northrop Grumman, Boeing, and Raytheon MC2A team was awarded a $215 million contract for pre-SDD (System Development and Demonstration) development of the aircraft. MC2A is an acronym for Multi-Sensor Command and Control Aircraft. The MC2A was intended to be the ultimate theater-wide combat control center.

While the Northrop Grumman E-8 Joint STARS aircraft was a recent development, it is the last such type based on the 707. Installing the high technology systems envisaged for the MC2A on an increasingly obsolete airframe would not provide the capability required. The availability of powerful and reliable turbofans allowed a twinjet to be considered.

In August 2003, Air International reported that the goal of integrating air- and ground-search radars on a single airframe was abandoned. Electronic interference between the active electronically scanned array (AESA) and ground-surveillance radars as well as the power requirements for both systems were cited as the reason. Instead the USAF decided to plan two separate E-10 fleets to be integrated with the proposed space-based radar system, air- and space-based ELINT/SIGINT assets, and space-based IMINT satellites. It would have been the central command authority for all air, land, and sea forces in a combat theater. The E-10 was also considered for use as a command center for unmanned combat air vehicles.

The capability of the MC2A was to be raised incrementally, with each phase known as a "spiral".

Spiral 1
Multi-Platform Radar Technology Insertion Program (MP-RTIP): This version would have provided substantial Joint Cruise Missile Defense (CMD) capability with focused AMTI modes and augment the E-8 Joint STARS in the ground surveillance role.
Spiral 2
AWACS Capability: This version would have replaced the E-3. It was expected that the Spiral 2 version would use a variant of the Boeing Wedgetail's Multi-role Electronically Scanned Array.
Spiral 3
SIGINT Platform: This version was intended to replace a wide range of SIGINT/ELINT aircraft. Beyond conceptual studies and preliminary research, this version was not being actively designed.

=== Scale-back and cancellation ===
In January 2006, the Air Force FY07 budget request revealed a reshaping of the E-10 program with the cancellation of the SDD program. Funding was maintained for the development and testing of a single demonstration aircraft, now known as the E-10A Technology Development Program (TDP). The TDP phase would flight test the MP-RTIP Wide-Area Surveillance (WAS) radar, and conduct flight demonstrations of the E-10A's Cruise Missile Defense (CMD) Capability. The SDD elimination was designed to be a cost-cutting measure and part of a larger reorganization and redefinition of the Air Force's mission including the retirement of the Boeing E-4B and Lockheed F-117A Nighthawk fleets, as well as the elimination of all but 58 Boeing B-52H Stratofortresses.

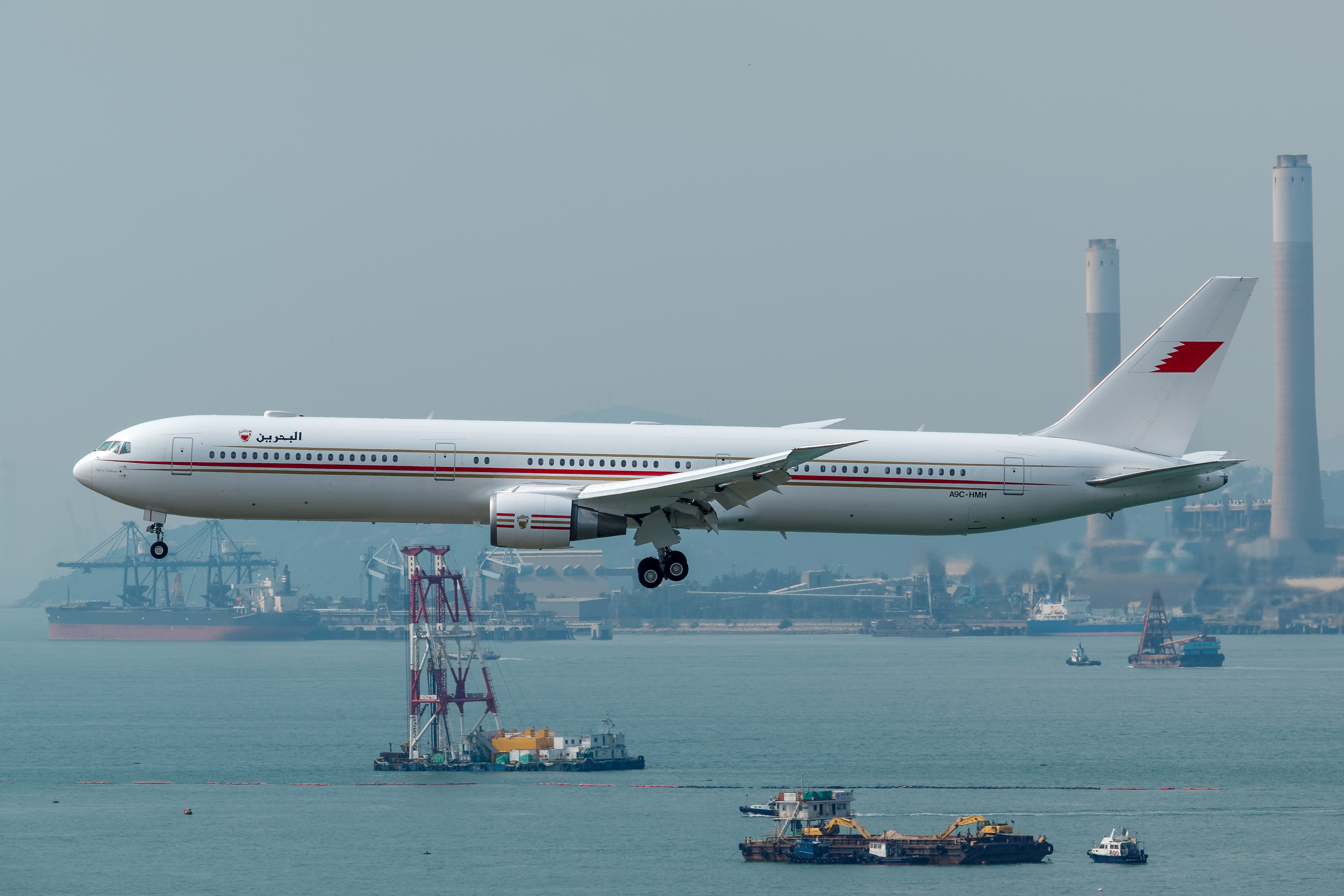
The E-10 prototype, currently operating for the Bahrain Royal Flight.

The E-10 finally disappeared at the end of FY2007 as budget pressures and competing priorities pushed it completely out of the budget. The USAF maintained funding for the MP-RTIP radar and may eventually put the radar on the E-8, or on a new aircraft, possibly the same airframe as the next aerial tanker. The smaller version of the MP-RTIP AESA radar designed to be flown on the Northrop Grumman RQ-4B Global Hawk has been flight tested on the Scaled Composites Proteus aircraft. Boeing had kept the E-10 prototype (767-400ER) at Paine Field in Everett, Washington, until it was sold to Bahrain in January 2009 for conversion into a VIP transport.

== Specifications (767-400ER with PW4000 engines) ==
Data from Boeing 767-400ER

General characteristics

- Crew: 2 + mission crew
- Length: 201 ft 1 in (61.3 m)
- Wingspan: 170 ft 3 in (51.9 m)
- Height: 55 ft 1 in (16.8 m)
- Empty weight: 228,999 lb (103,872 kg)
- Max takeoff weight: 449,999 lb (204,116 kg)
- Powerplant: 2 × Pratt & Whitney PW4000-94 high bypass turbofan, 63,300 lbf (282 kN) thrust each

Performance

- Maximum speed: 493 kn (567 mph, 913 km/h)
- Maximum speed: Mach 0.86
- Cruise speed: 460 kn (529 mph, 851 km/h) Mach 0.80
- Range: 5,600 nmi (6,440 mi, 10,370 km)
- Service ceiling: 40,000 ft (12,200 m)

== See also ==
Related development

- Boeing 767
- Boeing KC-767
- Boeing E-767
- Boeing 737 AEW&C E-7 Wedgetail

Aircraft of comparable role, configuration, and era

- Boeing E-3 Sentry
- Boeing EC-135
- Northrop Grumman E-8 Joint STARS
