= Multi-Platform Radar Technology Insertion Program =

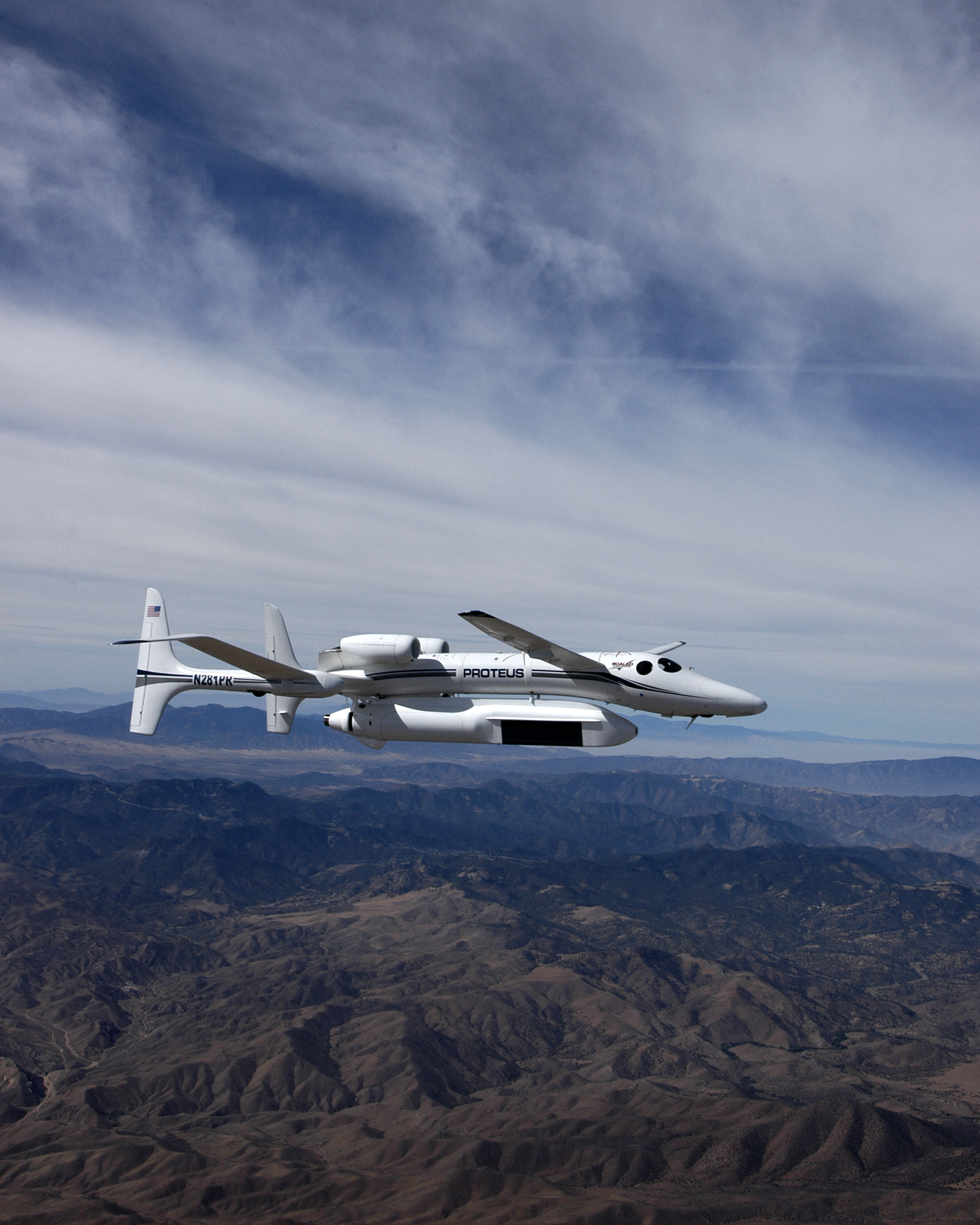
Proteus flies over the Tehachapi Mountains with the MP-RTIP radar pod.

The Multi-Platform Radar Technology Insertion Program (MP-RTIP), is a U.S. Air Force project led by contractor Northrop Grumman to develop the next generation of airborne air-to-air and air-to-ground radar systems. While initially planned to come in three sizes for multiple platforms, the MP-RTIP is currently intended only for the RQ-4B Global Hawk UAV.

== Overview ==
The MP-RTIP is a "modular, active electronically scanned array radar system" designed to be scaled in size in order to fit on board different platforms. The system is being developed from earlier Northrop Grumman radar systems, including the Joint Surveillance Target Attack Radar System (JointSTARS) and the existing Global Hawk system. The next-generation system will improve the Air Force's ability to track slow-moving ground vehicles and low-flying cruise missiles. The primary improvements are a dramatic increase in resolution and an ability "to collect ground moving target indicator imagery and synthetic aperture radar still images simultaneously".

The Global Hawk, which currently is an air-to-ground radar platform, was originally due to receive air-to-air capability through the MP-RTIP. That capability was subsequently removed from the test program's budget, however, in a reversal, funding for an air-to-air capability is being restored. RQ-4B Block 40 and later have MP-RTIP installed for dual air and ground surveillance capacity.

== Development ==
Phase I of the development program began in December, 2000. The three-year program was undertaken by Northrop Grumman at a contract cost of $410 million, and focused on the basic design of the radar system. Phase II is a six-year, $888 million contract awarded by the Air Force's Electronic Systems Center in May, 2004, under which the radar system is being developed, tested and integrated. Raytheon's Space and Airborne Systems is a subcontractor on the program, tasked with hardware development. Phase II calls for the production of six systems, three for Global Hawk and three for the E-10.

The Global Hawk's system was the first to be flight tested, a program for which Northrop Grumman used its Proteus aircraft (built by Scaled Composites). The MP-RTIP was mounted in a large pod fitted under Proteus. The program, jointly conducted by Northrop Grumman and the Air Force's 851st Electronic Systems Group, was operated from the Mojave Spaceport.

Eventually, the entire program was expected to cost $2 billion. With the E-10 program cancellation, five E-8 JointSTARS aircraft were expected to be retrofitted with the MP-RTIP. However, the USAF ended up pursuing cheaper ways to modernize the E-8, though the MP-RTIP receiver technology did see use in the form of JSTARS Radar Modernization (JSRM). Eventually, the MP-RTIP radar did enter service in the Global Hawk Block 40 aircraft for the U.S. Air Force and in the NATO Alliance Ground Surveillance (AGS) aircraft for NATO.
