= P13 =

P13 may refer to:

== Aircraft ==
- Aviatik P.13, a German reconnaissance biplane
- Lippisch P.13, a German experimental bomber
- Thomas-Morse XP-13 Viper, an American experimental biplane fighter

== Transport ==
- Highway P13 (Ukraine), now numbered H28
- London Buses route P13
- P13 Road (Zimbabwe)
- San Carlos Apache Airport, in Gila County, Arizona, United States

== Other uses ==
- Matumbi language
- NRK P13, a Norwegian radio station
- Papyrus 13, a biblical manuscript
- Pattern 1913 Enfield, a rifle
- P13, an alternative name of the pistol CZ P-10 C
- Puente 13, a street gang in La Puente, California
- P13, a film rating in Malaysia

== See also ==
- 13P (disambiguation)
