= Scaled Composites ATTT =

Aircraft in the US

ATTT

General information
- Type: Transport aircraft technology demonstrator
- National origin: United States
- Manufacturer: Scaled Composites
- Number built: 1

History
- First flight: 29 December 1987

The Scaled Composites Model 133-4.62 ATTT, or Advanced Technology Tactical Transport is a technology demonstration aircraft built by Burt Rutan's Scaled Composites in 1986 under contract to DARPA.

== Design and development ==
In the mid-1980s, the American government agency DARPA, developed a concept for a tandem wing STOL transport, intended to act as a technology demonstrator and to meet a requirement for a long-range high-speed transport for US special forces, intended to fill the gap between helicopters and larger transport aircraft such as the C-130 Hercules. In 1986, DARPA placed a contract with Scaled Composites, a company set up by Burt Rutan and owned by Beechcraft to build prototypes for advanced aircraft, for a 62% scale proof-of-concept demonstrator for the concept, called the Advanced Technology Tactical Transport (shortened to ATTT or AT^{3}).

The ATTT had high-aspect ratio tandem wings, joined by long nacelles which carried the aircraft's tractor configuration turboprop engines, large fuel tanks, and the main undercarriage units for the aircraft's retractable tricycle landing gear. As first built, it had a conventional, cruciform tail. A novel arrangement of eight fast acting fowler flaps was fitted, inboard and outboard of the engines on each of the wings. These would be extended rearwards in a low-drag configuration prior to commencing the take-off run then quickly lowered to increase lift at the point of take-off. The aircraft was of composite construction, mainly glassfibre and carbon fibre. It was powered by two Pratt & Whitney Canada PT6A-135 turboprops.

The ATTT demonstrator made its maiden flight on December 29, 1987 from Mojave Airport, base of Scaled Composites. It completed its initial test program of 51 test flights, with a total of 112 flying hours, on November 8, 1988. It was then rebuilt with a revised tail, with a twin-boom configuration replacing the original single cruciform tail unit, with the fuselage shortened and a rear-loading ramp fitted. The revised layout improved handling, lowering minimum single-engine safety speed (which was previously significantly higher than the stall speed). A further 13 test flights were flown to evaluate the revised layout.

The aircraft has been de-registered and is currently in storage at the Air Force Flight Test Center Museum at Edwards Air Force Base.

== Specifications (Final configuration) ==
Data from Jane's All The World's Aircraft 1990–91

General characteristics

- Length: 44 ft 10 in (13.67 m)
- Wingspan: 53 ft 2 in (16.21 m)
  - Foreplane span: 37 ft 8 in (11.48 m)
- Height: 14 ft 1 in (4.29 m)
- Wing area: 179.4 sq ft (16.67 m^{2})
  - Foreplane area: 118.08 sq ft (10.97 m^{2})
- Max takeoff weight: 11,500 lb (5,216 kg) (max flown)
- Powerplant: 2 × Pratt & Whitney Canada PT6A-135A turboprop, 750 shp (560 kW) each

Performance

- Maximum speed: 200 mph (310 km/h, 170 kn)
- Minimum control speed: 72 mph (117 km/h, 63 kn)
