= SpaceShipOne flight 13P =

Second powered flight of SpaceShipOne (2004)

- Operator: Scaled Composites
- Maximum altitude: 105,000 ft (32,000 m)

Aircraft properties
- Aircraft: SpaceShipOne
- Aircraft type: Rocket-powered aircraft
- Crew: 1

Flight timeline
- Takeoff date: April 8, 2004
- Takeoff site: Mojave Airport
- Landing date: April 8, 2004
- Landing site: Mojave Airport

Flight 13P of SpaceShipOne was its second powered flight, which occurred on April 8, 2004. The pilot was Peter Siebold.

== Details ==
SpaceShipOne was released from White Knight at an altitude of 45,600 ft (13,900 m). Ignition was delayed by about two minutes to evaluate a shock-induced stall buffet. The rocket was lit at an altitude of 38,300 feet (11.7 km) for a 40-second burn.

At burn-out, the Mach number was 1.6. The craft coasted to an apogee altitude of 105,000 feet (32.0 km).

During reentry the craft attained Mach 0.9. The craft switched to glider configuration at 40,000 feet (12.2 km). The craft returned to the Mojave Airport and landed safely.
