= VisionAire Vantage =

Prototype light business jet model

Vantage

General information
- Type: Light business jet
- National origin: United States of America
- Manufacturer: VisionAire Corporation
- Designer: Burt Rutan
- Status: Under development
- Number built: 1

History
- First flight: November 16, 1996

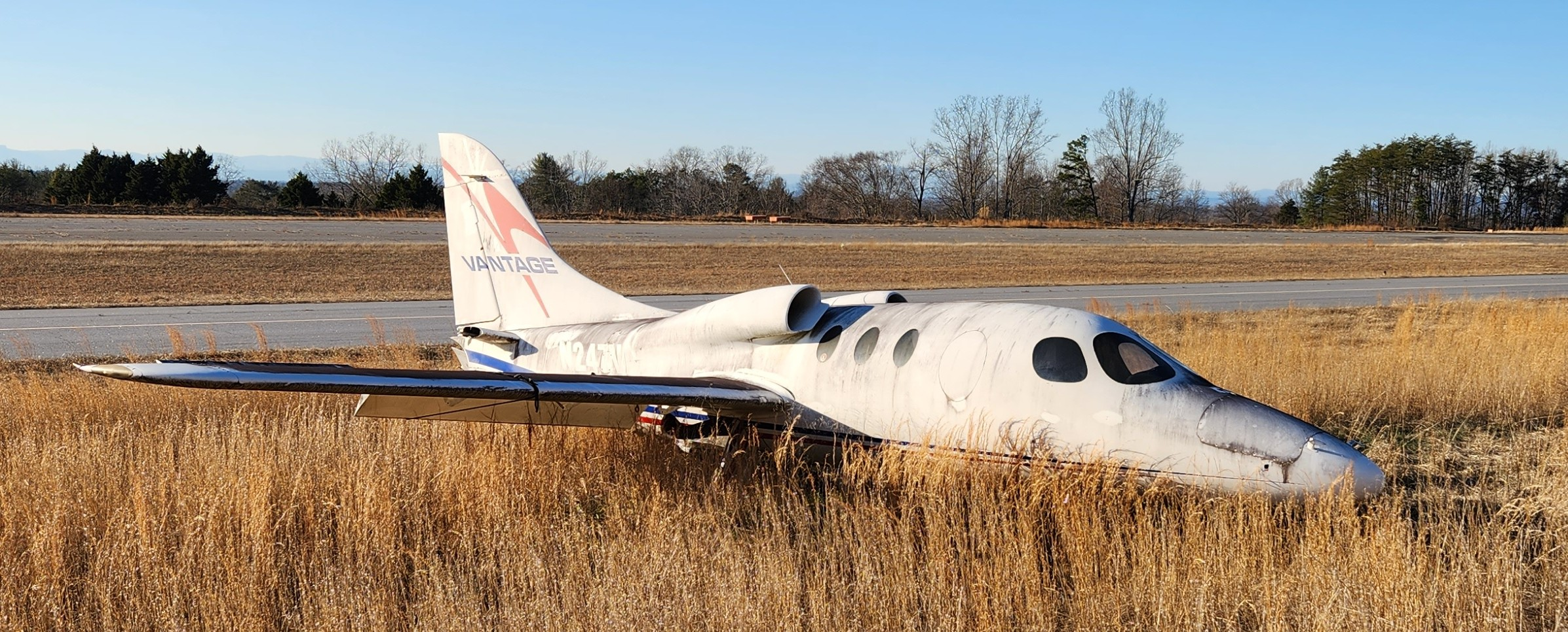
The only prototype Vantage made, tail number N247VA, sits in the grass at Hickory Regional Airport (KHKY) in Hickory, North Carolina. Photo from February 2023.

The VisionAire VA-10 Vantage is a prototype single-engined light business-jet (or "very light jet") designed and developed by the American company VisionAire Jets Corporation. Originally planned for production in the late 1990s, the original VisionAire Corporation failed in 2003. The project was acquired by Eviation Jets, which planned to produce it as the redesigned EV-20 Vantage Jet. Eviation also failed, and in 2012 the design was relaunched by a revived VisionAire under its original design.

== Design and development ==
The Vantage is currently being developed by VisionAire Jets, LLC, a successor company to VisionAire Corporation, founded in 1988, to fill a perceived gap in the light aircraft market between high performance piston-engined aircraft and twin-engined executive jets. The Vantage differed from contemporary executive jets in that it was powered by a single engine, a Pratt & Whitney Canada JT15D turbofan buried in the rear fuselage, fed by twin air-inlets above the fuselage. It was of all-composite construction, and its wing was forward swept to reduce drag and to allow an unobstructed cabin by mounting the wing spar behind the cabin. It was planned to sell the Vantage for $1.65 million, compared with $3.3 million for the Cessna CitationJet.

The first prototype, a proof-of-concept aircraft intended to confirm the design's handling, was designed and built by Burt Rutan's Scaled Composites in Mojave, California. It made its maiden flight on November 16, 1996. Flight testing revealed several handling and aerodynamic problems, which resulted in a redesign of the aircraft in December 1998.

Delays to the program continued, while costs mounted, and in January 2003, with the company having already spent $110 million, requiring another $125 million to complete certification and owing $35 million, a federal judge ordered VisionAire liquidated to pay its debts. The Vantage design was purchased by Eviation, for use as a basis for the twin-engined EV-20 Vantage Jet design.

The Vantage Proof-of-Concept (POC) aircraft is currently located at the VisionAire Jets facility at the Hickory Airport, Hickory North Carolina.

== Eviation EV-20 Vantage Jet ==
Following the purchase of the Vantage by Eviation Jets, the proposed EV-20 was envisioned as a twin-engine design with two Williams FJ44-1AP turbofan engines, with a projected cruise speed of 424 knots (785.2 km/h) at 36,000 feet (10,972.8 m) with an approximate range of 1,300 nautical miles (2,407.6 km). In the executive configuration it would have provided room for eight passengers, or ten commuter passengers. It would incorporate Garmin G1000 avionics, and would be made entirely from composite materials. By 2006, initial review of the EV-20 design were completed and construction of a prototype aircraft was expected to begin, utilizing an outside fabricator for construction of the prototype.

== Return to VisionAire ==
The redesign of the Vantage from a single- to a twin-engine design proved troublesome; the company failed to progress with the development of the type, and in 2012 the EV-20 was repurchased by VisionAire; the aircraft's design was returned to a single-engined configuration, and VisionAire stated in early 2013 that they planned to construct the Vantage in a factory in Newton, North Carolina, with the prototype scheduled to fly in 2014. In 2016 the company revealed some design changes, and that it was seeking further investment. However, by 2024 no further progress has been announced, and the latest version of the company's website is dated 2016.

== Specifications (VisionAire Vantage) ==
Data from Jane's All The World's Aircraft 2003–2004

General characteristics

- Crew: 1
- Capacity: 5 passengers
- Length: 41 ft 1.2 in (12.53 m)
- Wingspan: 47 ft 6 in (14.48 m)
- Height: 14 ft 4 in (4.37 m)
- Wing area: 234.0 sq ft (21.74 m^{2})
- Aspect ratio: 10.2:1
- Empty weight: 4,930 lb (2,236 kg)
- Max takeoff weight: 8,200 lb (3,720 kg)
- Fuel capacity: 240 US gal (908 L; 200 imp gal)
- Powerplant: 1 × Williams FJ44-3AP turbofan, 3,045 lbf (13.54 kN) thrust

Performance

- Maximum speed: 431 mph (694 km/h, 375 kn) (max cruise)
- Cruise speed: 288 mph (464 km/h, 250 kn) (econ cruise)
- Stall speed: 80 mph (129 km/h, 69 kn) (power off, flaps down)
- Range: 1,150 mi (1,650 km, 1,000 nmi) (max fuel, six occupants)
- Service ceiling: 41,000 ft (12,500 m)
- Rate of climb: 4,000 ft/min (20.3 m/s)

== See also ==
Related lists

- List of very light jets
