= USAF Hunter-Killer =

Tactical vehicle procurement program

Hunter-Killer is an unofficial project name based upon an Aviation Week & Space Technology article. The U.S. Air Force's Hunter-Killer program was a tactical unmanned combat air vehicles (UCAV) procurement program. The General Atomics MQ-9 Reaper, a variant of the MQ-1 Predator won the project and was deployed in Afghanistan.

The term “HK” or Hunter-Killer was used in the 1984 film The Terminator to describe autonomous, twin-ducted fan UAS capable of identifying and destroying targets.

== History ==
This is the U.S. Air Force program for which several companies have developed vehicles.

Although the J-UCAS concept is a long way from the early idea of a "reusable cruise missile", that notion is apparently alive and well.

=== Lockheed Martin Minion ===
In September 2003, an announcement was made that Lockheed Martin's "Skunk Works" was developing a stealthy air-launched UCAV named "Minion". Its radar cross section is smaller than that of the F/A-22 Raptor (return smaller than a marble) and F-35 Joint Strike Fighter Details released describe it as having a launch weight of 3,400 kilograms (7,500 lb) and able to carry a reconnaissance payload, a jammer system, a high-power microwave weapon, or four 100 kilograms (220 lb) GPS-guided small-diameter bombs. It could also be used as a decoy, though it would need to have radar-enhancement payload as it is described as extremely stealthy.

Range is given as up to 1,000 nautical miles (1,850 kilometers). Two would be carried into combat by a single strike fighter such as a Lockheed Martin F-22 Raptor, with one under each wing, and launched from standoff distances to attack heavily defended targets. In practice, two strike fighters are expected to be used, launching four Minions, with the pilot of one aircraft watching out for threats while the other directs the UCAVs over a line-of-sight communications link. After the mission, the Minions would return to base and land conventionally on retractable landing gear.

A vague picture released with the announcement showed the Minion to have a certain broad resemblance to various air-launched cruise missiles, such as the Anglo-French Matra-BAe Dynamics APACHE / Storm Shadow or the US AGM-158A Joint Air to Surface Standoff Missile (JASSM), which is also built by Lockheed Martin and may have some degree of commonality with the Minion. The picture showed the Minion to have a spikelike, square-sided fuselage, with pop-out wings and twin tailfins, with the engine inlet just forward of the tailfins and the exhaust just behind the tailfins. Both the intake and the exhaust are shielded by triangular covers.

Despite the stealthiness of the Minion, Lockheed Martin is designing it for low cost, to be substantially cheaper than the $400,000 JASSM. Rumors about a Skunk Works project involving a cruise-missile-like UCAV had been circulating for a year or two before the announcement. There were also very vague and unconfirmed rumors that the Minion was used in an operational evaluation during the invasion of Iraq in the spring of 2003.

=== Other designs ===
Somewhat more visibly, in the summer of 2004, the Air Force, in need of a less expensive short-term UCAV solution with a focus on endurance, opened up a competition for a "Hunter-Killer" UCAV. Specifications include:

- An operating altitude of 10.7 to 15.25 kilometres (35,100 to 50,000 ft).
- Endurance from 16 to 30 hours or more carrying a warload of 1,360 kilograms (3,000 lb), in specific six 225 kilograms (496 lb) guided bombs.
- Fit of SAR/MTI or EO/IR sensors and laser target designator. The Hunter-Killer would be capable of performing surveillance or reconnaissance missions along with its active combat role.

Cost specifications were given as US$10 million per aircraft and $30 million per "system", with each system including two aircraft and the necessary support gear. The Hunter-Killer program has attracted considerable interest and a number of interesting proposals.

Northrop Grumman has come up with two concepts. The first is the "Model 395", a militarized version of the Scaled Composites Proteus modified to a pure UAV configuration, with a sensor turret under the nose and a SAR-MTI pod under the forward fuselage, and carrying munitions on the centerline, for example tandem triple racks to carry six 225 kilograms (496 lb) munitions. With reduced fuel, it could even carry a single 2,270 kilograms (5,000 lb) bunker buster. At maximum takeoff weight, it would have a ceiling of 15,000 meters (49,000 ft).

The other Northrop Grumman proposal is effectively a half-weight Global Hawk, the "Model 396", with a wingspan of 10.7 meters (35 ft), a length of 7 meters (23 ft), and a gross weight of 6,800 kilograms (15,000 lb), half that of the Global Hawk. It would be powered by a single Pratt & Whitney 545 bizjet turbofan.

General Atomics offered the turboprop-powered Predator B for the role. Aurora Flight Sciences and Israel Aircraft Industries are offering an armed Heron II. Lockheed Martin has responded to the Air Force request but has been keeping quiet about their proposals. Boeing did not submit a proposal, stating the company was busy with other UCAV work.

Raytheon proposed a sixth option, whereby they would offer a combination of sensors, communications systems, and other mission-related systems as a package, and then choose an airframe at a later date. Raytheon's perspective was that, as long as it performs to a minimum set of specifications, the individual airframe is less important than the systems it will carry.

The Air Force wanted to field the Hunter-Killer by 2007 and may order up to 60 machines. The program seems focused to avoid "gold plate", and most of the avionics will likely be off-the-shelf.
