= Scaled Composites White Knight =

SpaceShipOne mother ship

White Knight
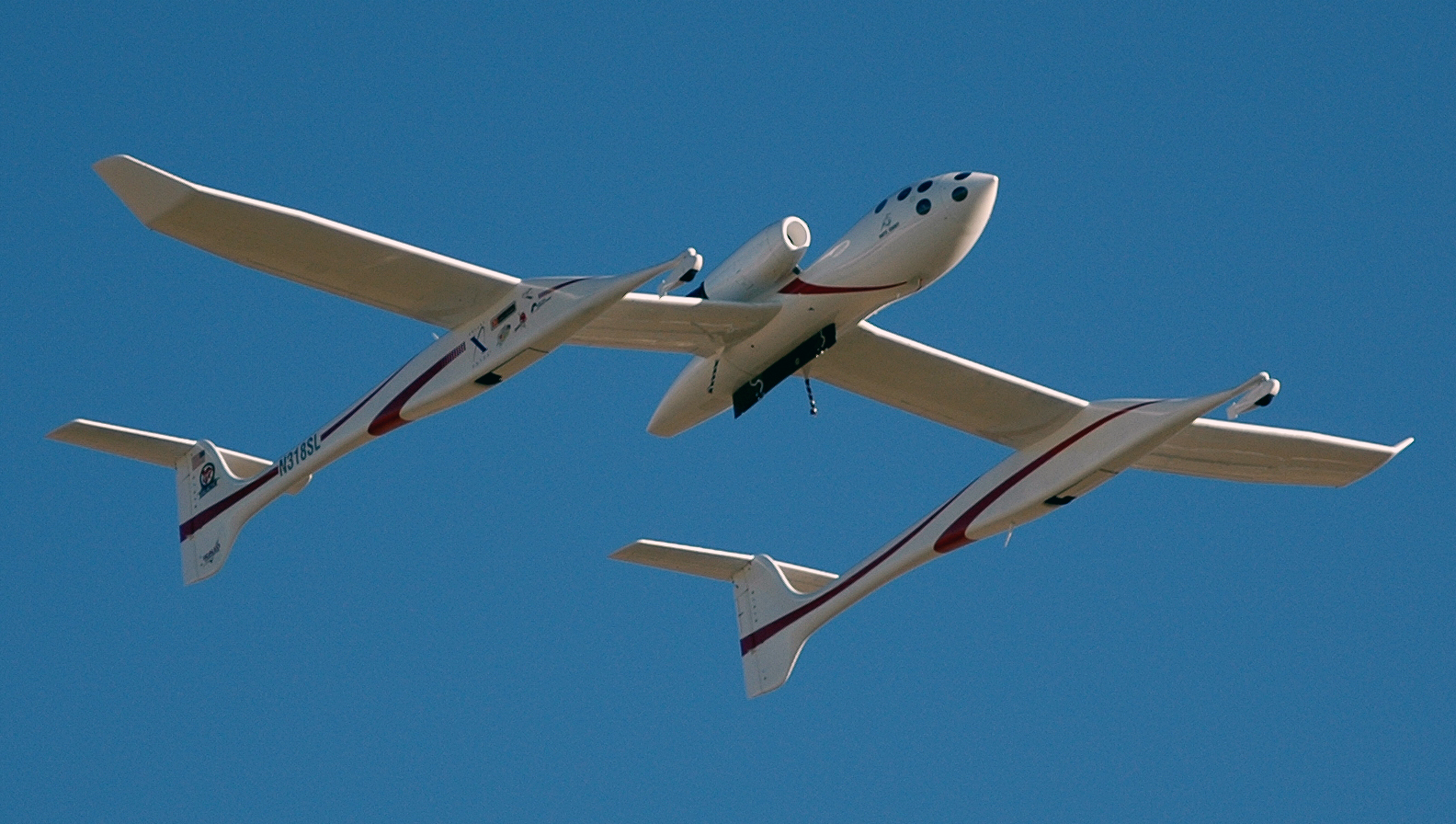
- White Knight One

General information
- Type: Mother ship
- National origin: United States
- Manufacturer: Scaled Composites
- Status: Retired
- Number built: 1

History
- First flight: August 1, 2002
- Retired: 2014
- Developed from: Scaled Composites Proteus
- Developed into: Scaled Composites White Knight Two

The Scaled Composites Model 318 White Knight (now also called White Knight One) is a jet-powered carrier aircraft that was used to launch its companion SpaceShipOne, an experimental spaceplane. The White Knight and SpaceShipOne were designed by Burt Rutan and manufactured by Scaled Composites, a private company founded by Rutan in 1982. On three separate flights in 2004, White Knight conducted SpaceShipOne into flight, and SpaceShipOne then performed a sub-orbital spaceflight, becoming the first private craft to reach space.

The White Knight is notable as an example of a mother ship which carried a parasite aircraft into flight, releasing the latter which would then execute a high-altitude flight, or a sub-orbital spaceflight. This flight profile is shared with The High and Mighty One and Balls 8, two modified B-52s which carried the North American X-15 into flight. It is also shared with White Knight Two, a descendant which carries SpaceShipTwo into flight as part of the Virgin Galactic fleet.

Following the SpaceShipOne flights, the White Knight was contracted for drop tests of the Boeing X-37 spaceplane, from June 2005 until April 2006. The White Knight was retired from service in 2014, and is in the inventory of the Flying Heritage Collection.

== Design and development ==
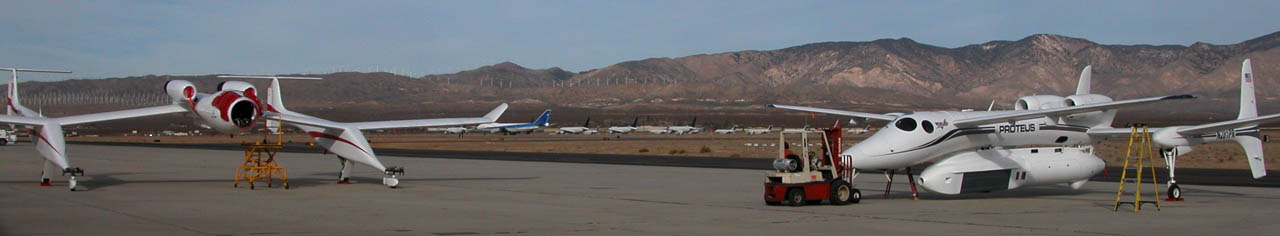
White Knight compared with Scaled Composites Proteus

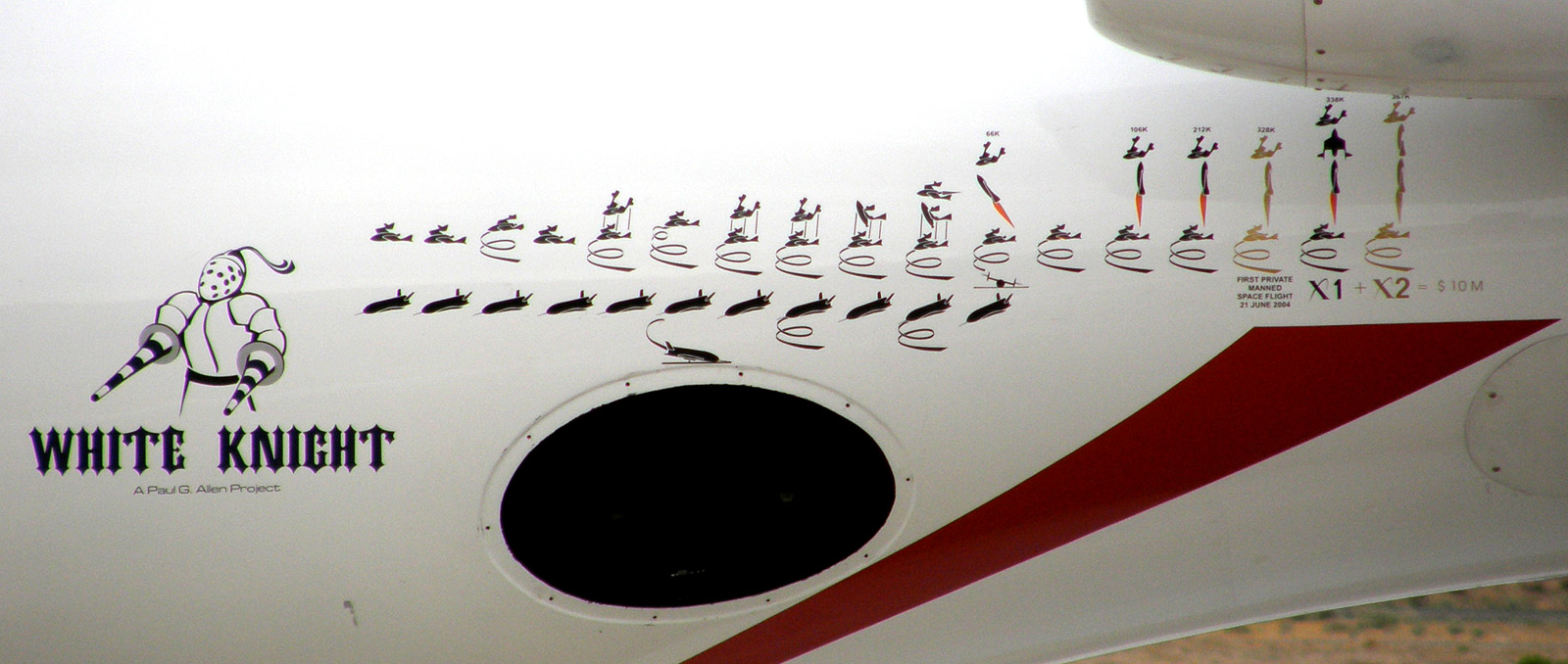
White Knight's mission decals

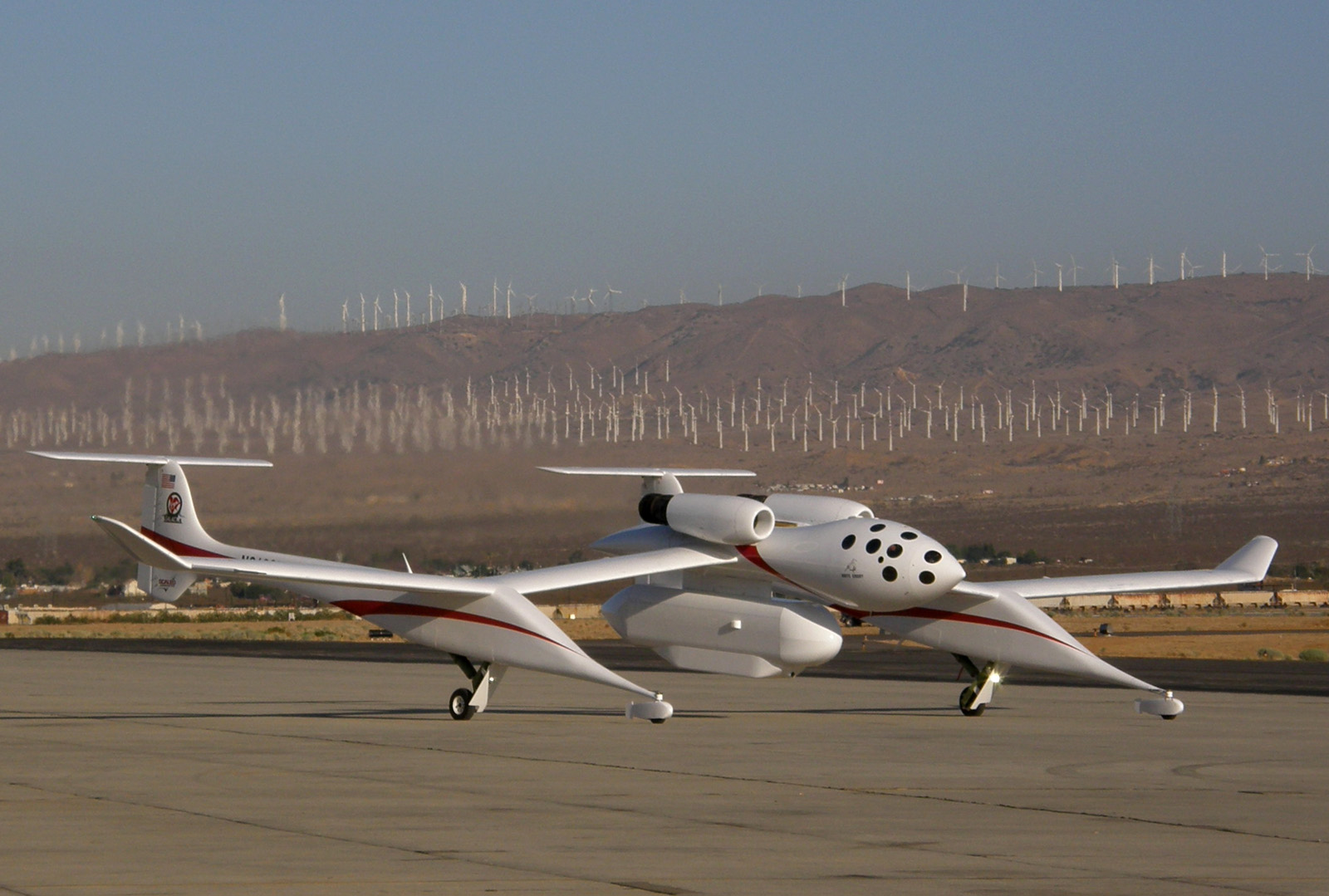
White Knight carrying a Northrop Grumman radar pod

The Scaled Composites model number for White Knight is 318. White Knight is registered with the Federal Aviation Administration as N318SL.

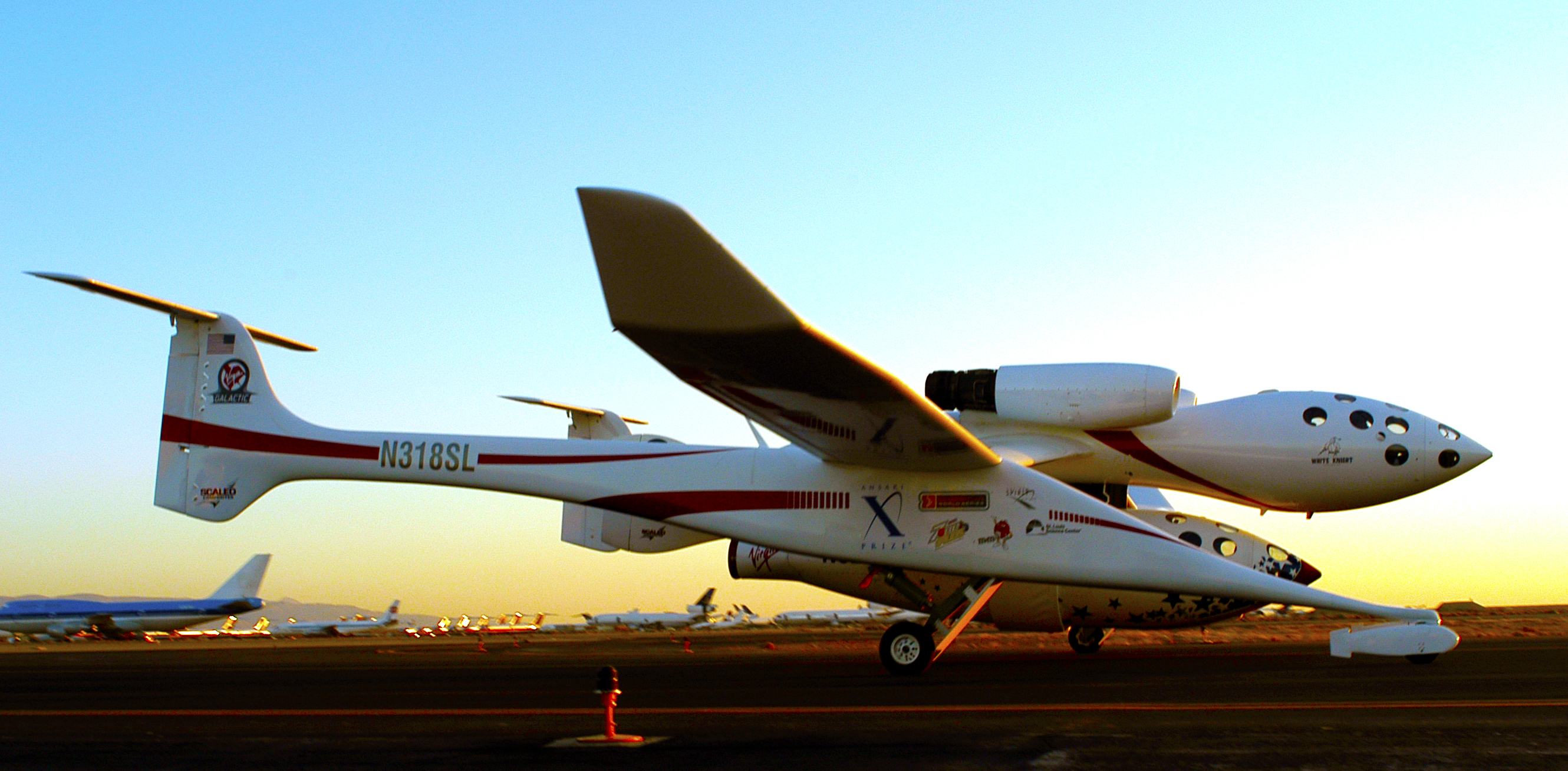
White Knight carries SpaceShipOne to mission 16P

The White Knight carrier airplane was designed around the twin afterburning General Electric J85 engines, which were selected for their availability and low cost. The aircraft was a completely new independent design. White Knight and SpaceShipOne shared the same forward fuselage outer mold line (OML) to reduce development costs and with the original intent to allow for White Knight to act as a flying simulator for training SpaceShipOne pilots. White Knight first flew on August 1, 2002. The flight was aborted shortly after takeoff due to a problem with the outboard wing spoilers. These trailing edge spoilers were designed to greatly increase the glide slope so that the White Knight vehicle could act as a flying simulator for training of SpaceShipOne pilots. During the first flight, the mechanical over-center torque was insufficient to maintain the spoilers in the closed position. The spoilers deployed into the free stream and began a limit cycle forcing the pilot (Mike Melvill) to abort. The spoilers were subsequently disabled completely and the desire for a steep glide slope matching SpaceShipOne was abandoned.

White Knight next flew on August 5, 2002, and this time performed well. Development proceeded over the next few months. With White Knight developed and evaluated, on April 18, 2003, White Knight and SpaceShipOne were presented to the media.

Subsequently, White Knight flew as part of the Tier One program that won the Ansari X Prize on October 4, 2004.

Afterwards, White Knight was used to carry and launch DARPA's experimental X-37 spaceplane for its approach and landing tests in 2005 and 2006.

It was followed up by the White Knight Two, which has a similar but larger design.

== SpaceShipOne program ==
Flights of White Knight are numbered, starting with flight 1 on August 1, 2002. Flights where SpaceShipOne was carried also get one or two appended letters. An appended "C" indicates that the flight was a captive carry, and "L" indicates that SpaceShipOne was launched. If the flight actually flown differs in category from the intended flight, then two letters are appended, the first giving the intended mission and the second the mission actually performed.

White Knight flights carrying SpaceShipOne
Flight	Date	SS1 Pilot	SpaceShipOne flight
24C	May 20, 2003	Peter Siebold	01C
29C	July 29, 2003	Brian Binnie	02C
30L	August 7, 2003	Brian Binnie	03G
31LC	August 27, 2003	Brian Binnie	04GC
32L	August 27, 2003	Brian Binnie	05G
37L	September 23, 2003	Peter Siebold	06G
38L	October 17, 2003	Peter Siebold	07G
40L	November 14, 2003	Brian Binnie	08G
41L	November 19, 2003	Brian Binnie	09G
42L	December 4, 2003	Peter Siebold	10G
43L	December 17, 2003	Peter Siebold	11P
49L	March 11, 2004	Brian Binnie	12G
53L	April 8, 2004	Brian Binnie	13P
56L	May 13, 2004	Brian Binnie	14P
60L	June 21, 2004	Mike Melvill	15P
65L	September 29, 2004	Mike Melvill	16P
66L	October 4, 2004	Brian Binnie	17P

== X-37 test program ==
White Knight was contracted to perform both captive carry and drop test flights of the DARPA/Boeing X-37. First captive carry flight was on June 21, 2005, and first drop was on April 7, 2006 (the X-37 was subsequently damaged on landing at Edwards Air Force Base). Initially, the flights originated from Mojave, but following the landing incident, the program was moved to Air Force Plant 42 in Palmdale, California, and at least five subsequent flights were made there.

== Adaptive Compliant Wing test program ==
In late 2006, White Knight flew a seven-flight test program of the adaptive compliant wing developed by FlexSys Inc. with funding by the Air Force Research Laboratory. A laminar flow test article was mounted vertically under White Knight's centerline pylon for the 20-flight-hour research program that tested the flexible wing's aerodynamic characteristics.

== Retirement to museum ==
In July 2014 White Knight made its final planned flight, arriving at Paine Field in Everett, Washington, to become part of the Flying Heritage Collection.

== Specifications ==
Data from Scaled Composites

General characteristics

- Crew: 3
- Capacity: 8,000 lb (3,600 kg) payload
- Wingspan: 83 ft (25 m)
- Empty weight: 6,360 lb (2,885 kg)
- Max takeoff weight: 18,000 lb (8,165 kg)
- Fuel capacity: 6,400 lb (2,900 kg)
- Powerplant: 2 × General Electric J85-GE-5 afterburning turbojet, 2,400 lbf (11 kN) thrust each dry, 3,600 lbf (16 kN) with afterburner

Performance

- Service ceiling: 53,000 ft (16,000 m)

=== Other features and capabilities ===
- Carriage and launch of payloads up to 7,000 lb (3,200 kg)
- Altitude capability above 53,000 ft
- Large, three-place cabin (60 in (1,524 mm) diameter outside, 59 in (1,499 mm) inside)
- Sea level cabin qualified for unlimited altitude
- ECS scrubs CO_{2}, removes humidity and defogs windows
- Two crew doors with dual seals and dual-pane windows
- Manual flight controls with three-axis electric trim
- Avionics include INS-GPS navigator, flight-director, flight test data (recording and T/M), air-data, vehicle health monitoring, backup flight instruments, and video system
- The 82 ft (25 m) wing can be extended to 93 ft (28 m) for increased climb capability
- Super-effective, pneumatic speed brakes allow steep descent with L/D < 4.5
- Hydraulic wheel brakes and nose-gear steering
- Pneumatic main gear retraction
- Dual-bus electrical power system
- Cockpit allows single-pilot operation (VMC-day conditions only)

== See also ==
- Flying aircraft carrier
- Conroy Virtus
- Lockheed twin-body C-5 Shuttle Carrier proposal
- Scaled Composites Proteus
- Scaled Composites Stratolaunch
