= Scaled Composites =

American aerospace company

Coordinates: 35.0564°N 118.1610°W

Scaled Composites, LLC
- Type: Division
- Industry: Aerospace industry
- Founded: 1982
- Founder: Burt Rutan
- Headquarters: Mojave, California
- Key people: Greg Morris, President; Jennifer Santiago, Executive Vice President
- Products: Air vehicle design, tooling, and manufacturing, specialty composite structure design, analysis and fabrication, and developmental flight test
- Number of employees: Over 200
- Parent: Northrop Grumman
- Website: www.scaled.com

Scaled Composites (often called simply Scaled) is an American aerospace company founded by Burt Rutan and currently owned by Northrop Grumman. It is located at the Mojave Air and Space Port in Mojave, California, United States.

Founded to develop experimental aircraft, the company now focuses on designing and developing concept craft and prototype fabrication processes for aircraft and other vehicles. It is known for unconventional designs, for its use of non-metal, composite materials, and for winning the Ansari X Prize with its experimental spacecraft SpaceShipOne.

== Company history ==
Scaled Composites was established in 1982 and purchased by the Beech Aircraft Corporation in 1985, as a result of the collaboration on the Starship project. In 1988, Beech's parent company, Raytheon, sold Scaled back to Rutan, who then sold it to Wyman-Gordon.

After Wyman-Gordon was acquired by Precision Castparts Corp., Rutan and ten investors re-acquired the company as Scaled Composites, LLC. Northrop Grumman, a major shareholder in the company with a 40% stake, said it would acquire the company outright on July 20, 2007.

Both companies said Northrop Grumman's acquisition would not affect Scaled Composites' strategy or involve replacing Burt Rutan as senior manager. The acquisition by Northrop Grumman was completed on August 24, 2007.

Rutan retired in April 2011. Ben Diachun, a long time employee, was president of Scaled from October 31, 2015, until April 2019. Cory Bird, another long-time employee, became president of Scaled in April 2019.

=== Early projects ===
Before forming Scaled Composites, Burt Rutan had designed several aircraft for amateur builders, including the VariEze, often considered one of general aviation's most innovative designs. He also designed the Beechcraft Starship, which was a commercial failure. These aircraft were distinctive because of their canard configuration, winglets and pusher propellers.

In 2005, the single-jet GlobalFlyer was flown by billionaire adventurer Steve Fossett on the first solo non-stop, non-refueled flight around the world, and later in the longest flight in history: 41,467.53 km (25,766.73 mi). It had been designed by Rutan, with aerodynamics by John Roncz, and built by Scaled Composites. as the Model 311. Although their role was not widely publicized, Rutan and Roncz, who had provided aerodynamics support to a number of previous Rutan projects including Starship, helped design, and Scaled Composites manufactured, the double slotted wing mast for the Stars & Stripes catamaran for Dennis Conner's entry in the 1988 America's Cup.

=== SpaceShipOne ===
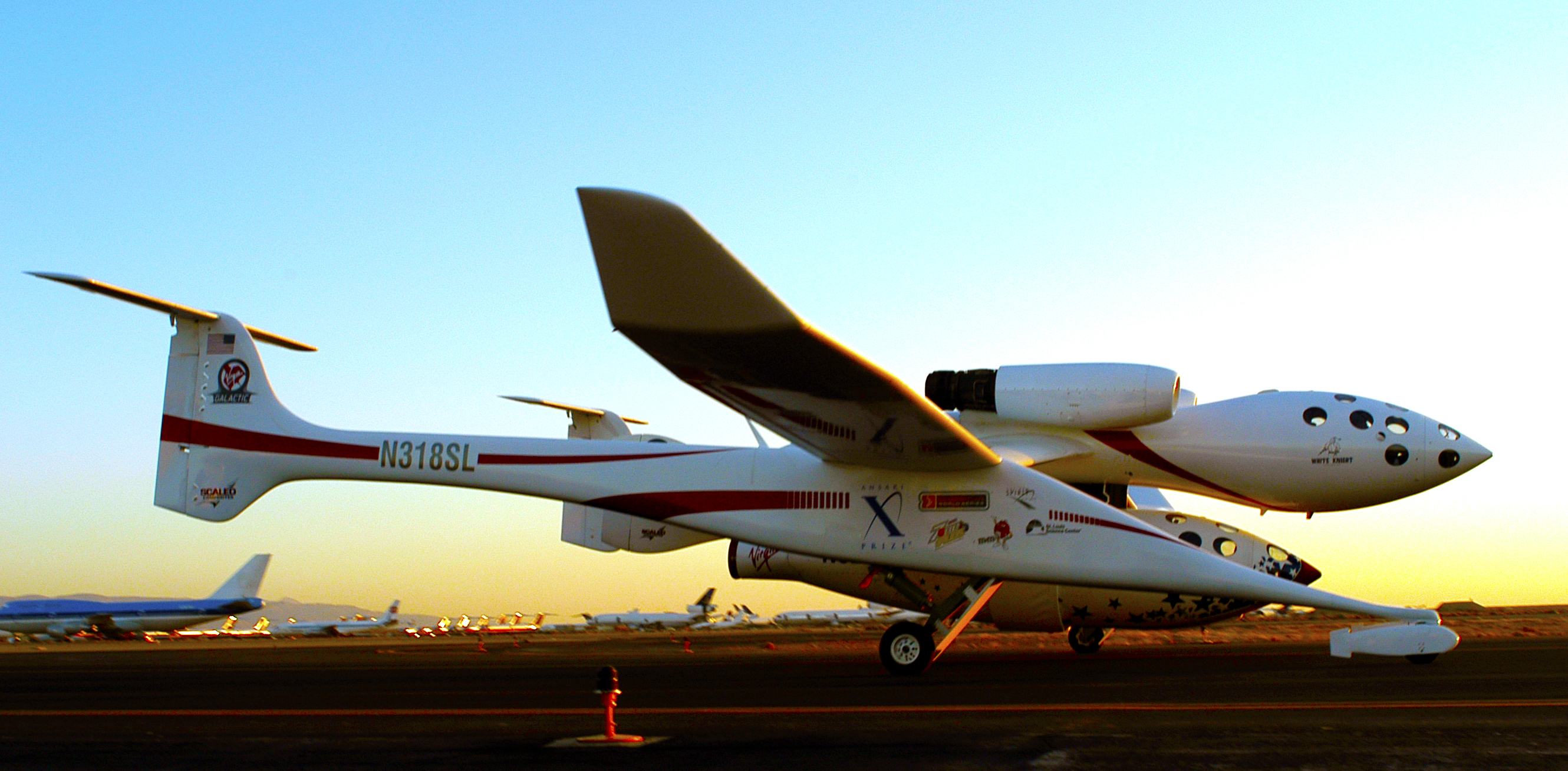
The White Knight carries SpaceShipOne on Flight 16P September 29, 2004.

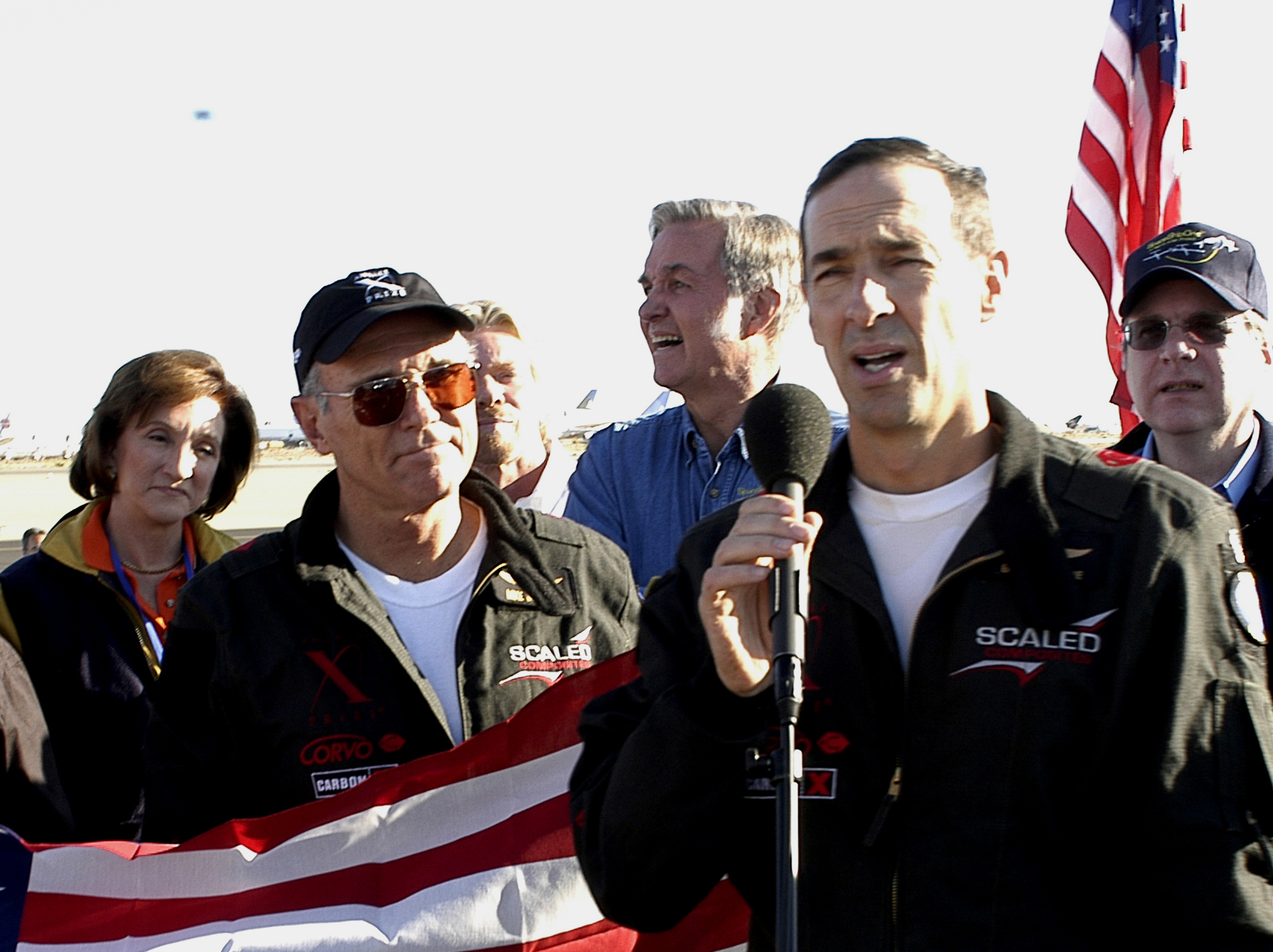
(L to R) Marion Blakely, FAA - Chief. Commercial Astronaut- Michael Winston "Mike" Melvill - Sir Richard Charles Nicholas Branson - Elbert Leander "Burt" Rutan - William Brian Binnie & Paul Gardner Allen reflect on a mission accomplished (October 4, 2004)

The company announced in April 2003 that it was working on a privately funded spacecraft, in an attempt to win the Ansari X PRIZE for the first private crewed spaceflight. This experimental rocket-powered spacecraft was given the name SpaceShipOne.

On December 17, 2003, they announced SpaceShipOne's first supersonic flight, the first flight of its kind by a privately funded aircraft. SpaceShipOne successfully made this flight, reaching 68,000 feet (21,000 m) and 930 mph (Mach 1.2). The craft was taken aloft by the White Knight carrier aircraft. On the same day, Paul Allen, one of the founders of Microsoft, confirmed publicly the rumors that he was the angel investor behind the SpaceShipOne venture.

On April 1, 2004, the U.S. Department of Transportation issued the company what it called the world's first license for a sub-orbital crewed rocket flight. The license was approved by the Federal Aviation Administration's Office of Commercial Space Transportation, which has backed licenses for more than 150 commercial launches of uncrewed launch vehicles in its 20 years, but never a license for crewed flight on a sub-orbital trajectory. The Mojave Airport, operating part-time as Mojave Spaceport, is the launch point for SpaceShipOne. SpaceShipOne performed the first privately funded human spaceflight on June 21, 2004. Flight 16P on September 29, 2004, and Flight 17P on October 4, 2004, won the X-Prize for Scaled Composites and SpaceShipOne.

=== Stratolaunch Carrier Aircraft ===
Scaled Composites Model 351 (nicknamed the "Roc") was built for Stratolaunch Systems to provide a platform from which air-launch space missions can be staged. In August 2015, Scaled Composites president Kevin Mickey stated the company had so far assembled "roughly 200,000 pounds of composite structure" for the vehicle and if put on a football field, "its wingtips would extend beyond the goalposts by 15 feet on each side." Each of the twin fuselages of the aircraft is 238 feet (73 m) long and is supported by 12 main landing gear wheels and two nose gear wheels. It requires 12,000 feet of runway to lift-off.

=== Rutan Aircraft Factory aircraft ===
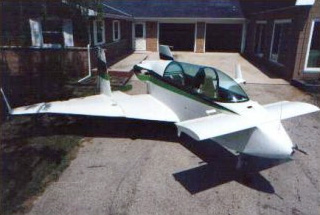
Rutan Aircraft's first – Model 32 VariViggen (1972)

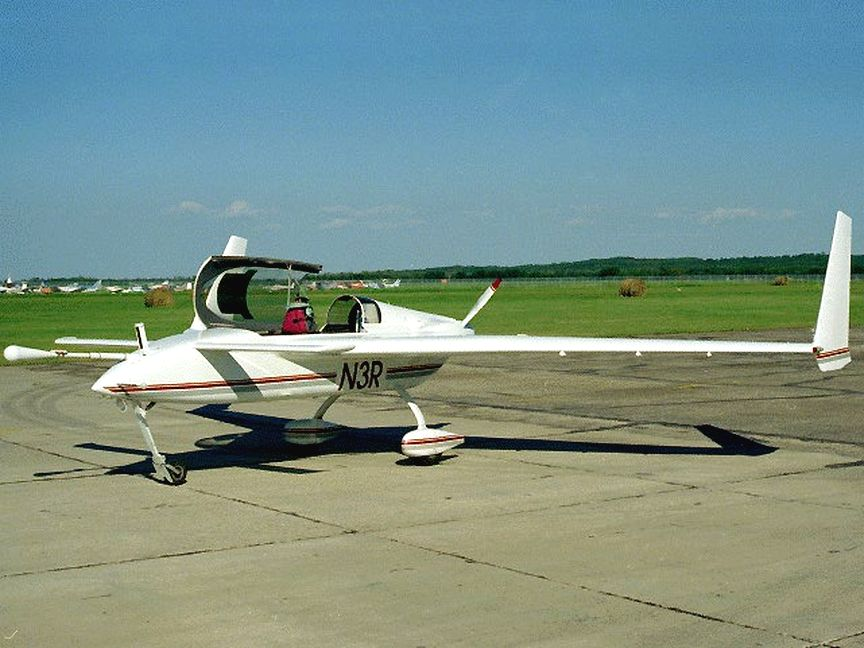
Rutan Model 61 Long-EZ

Burt Rutan created Rutan Aircraft Factory to market a commercial variation of his Model "VariViggen" prototype" he began building in his garage in 1968 which he called The Model 32, also known as the VariViggen SP. This model utilized a slightly longer fuselage, larger span and winglets in order to increase efficiency. Within 8 years after its founding, this company became one of the world's important aircraft design and prototyping companies.

The Rutan Aircraft Factory sold over 600 plan sets for the VariViggen to homebuilders, and eventually about 20 of the aircraft were built. Following the crash of one in New Brunswick, Canada, in September 2006 due to wing tank fuel contamination, fewer than five are currently still flying. The prototype aircraft, N27VV, was donated to the EAA AirVenture Museum in 1988.

- Model 27 VariViggen (1972)
- Model 31 VariEze (1975)
- Model 32 VariViggen SP (1973)
- Model 33 VariEze (1976)
- Model 35 AD-1 (1979)
- Model 40/74 Defiant (1978)
- Model 54 Quickie (1978)
- Model 61 Long-EZ (1979)
- NASA AD-1 (1979)
- Model 68 AMSOIL Racer (1981)
- Model 73 NGT: Three-fifths scale model of Fairchild T-46 trainer (1981)
- Model 72 Grizzly (1982)
- Model 76 Voyager: First aircraft to circumnavigate the Earth non-refueled, non-stop (1986)
- Model 77 Solitaire (1982)
- Model 81 Catbird (1988) five-seat single-engine aircraft
- Model 202 Boomerang: (1996) Asymmetric 5–seat aircraft
- Model 437 Vanguard: multi-mission military demonstration aircraft with both manned and unmanned capabilities

=== Scaled Composites aircraft ===
Model	Name	First flight	Description
115	Beechcraft Starship	1982	85% scale prototype, twin-turboprop, canard business aircraft
	B-2 Spirit		Scale model for radar cross-section tests of the stealth bomber
133	ATTT	1986	STOL, tandem-wing transport demonstrator
143	Triumph	1988	Three-surface, twin-engine very light jet prototype for Beechcraft
	IAI Searcher	1992	larger AAI RQ-2 Pioneer reconnaissance UAV
	Model TRA324 Scarab	1992	Reconnaissance UAV for Teledyne Ryan (Northrop Grumman since 1999)
	DC-X	1993	structural aeroshell and control surfaces for McDonnell Douglas
151	ARES	1990	single-jet Close Air Support demonstrator
	Pegasus rocket	1990	Wings and fins for Orbital ATK
158	Pond Racer	1990	twin-boom air racer
	Bell Eagle Eye	1998	UAV tiltrotor demonstrator for Bell Helicopter
205/206			1991 designs for airlaunch of a booster rocket heavier than 500,000 lb (230 t)
	Orion Industries UAV Model 706 Sea Bat	1995	UAV prototype for the US Navy
247	Vantage	1996	prototype single-engine very light jet for VisionAire
271	V-Jet II	1997	single jet demonstrator for Williams International
276	NASA X-38	1998	fuselage of experimental emergency re-entry vehicle for the ISS
281	Proteus	1998	High-Altitude Long Endurance twinjet with tandem wings
	Roton ATV	1999	Fuselage for the Rotary Rocket concept of a reusable SSTO manned spacecraft
287	NASA ERAST Program		proof of concept model for 85,000 ft (26,000 m) UAV
309	M-309 CarbonAero	2000	Piston push-pull six-seater prototype for the Adam A500
326	X-47A Pegasus	2001	Northrop Grumman Unmanned Combat Aerial Vehicle demonstrator
302	Toyota TA-1	2002	prototype general aviation four-seater for Toyota
316	SpaceShipOne	2003	experimental sub-orbital ship for air launch, within Tier One
318	White Knight	2003	twinjet mother ship for SpaceShipOne derived from Proteus
311	Virgin Atlantic GlobalFlyer	2004	Solo Jet aircraft for nonstop circumnavigation
339	SpaceShipTwo	2008	Virgin Galactic's air-launched Sub-orbital ship for space tourism
348	White Knight Two	2008	quadjet mother ship lifting the SpaceShipTwo to altitude
351	Stratolaunch	2019	built for Stratolaunch Systems to carry air launch to orbit rockets, largest aircraft by wingspan
367	BiPod	2011	experimental hybrid electric flying car
395	Proteus development		Proposed unmanned and armed version for the USAF Hunter-Killer program
396	RQ-4 Global Hawk variant		Smaller, armed version of the RQ-4 Global Hawk for the USAF Hunter-Killer program
400	Swift	2016	jet trainer contender for the T-X program
401	Deimos & Phobos	2017	manned and unmanned Close Air Support demonstrators
	LauncherOne	2020	Air-launched rocket for Virgin Orbit

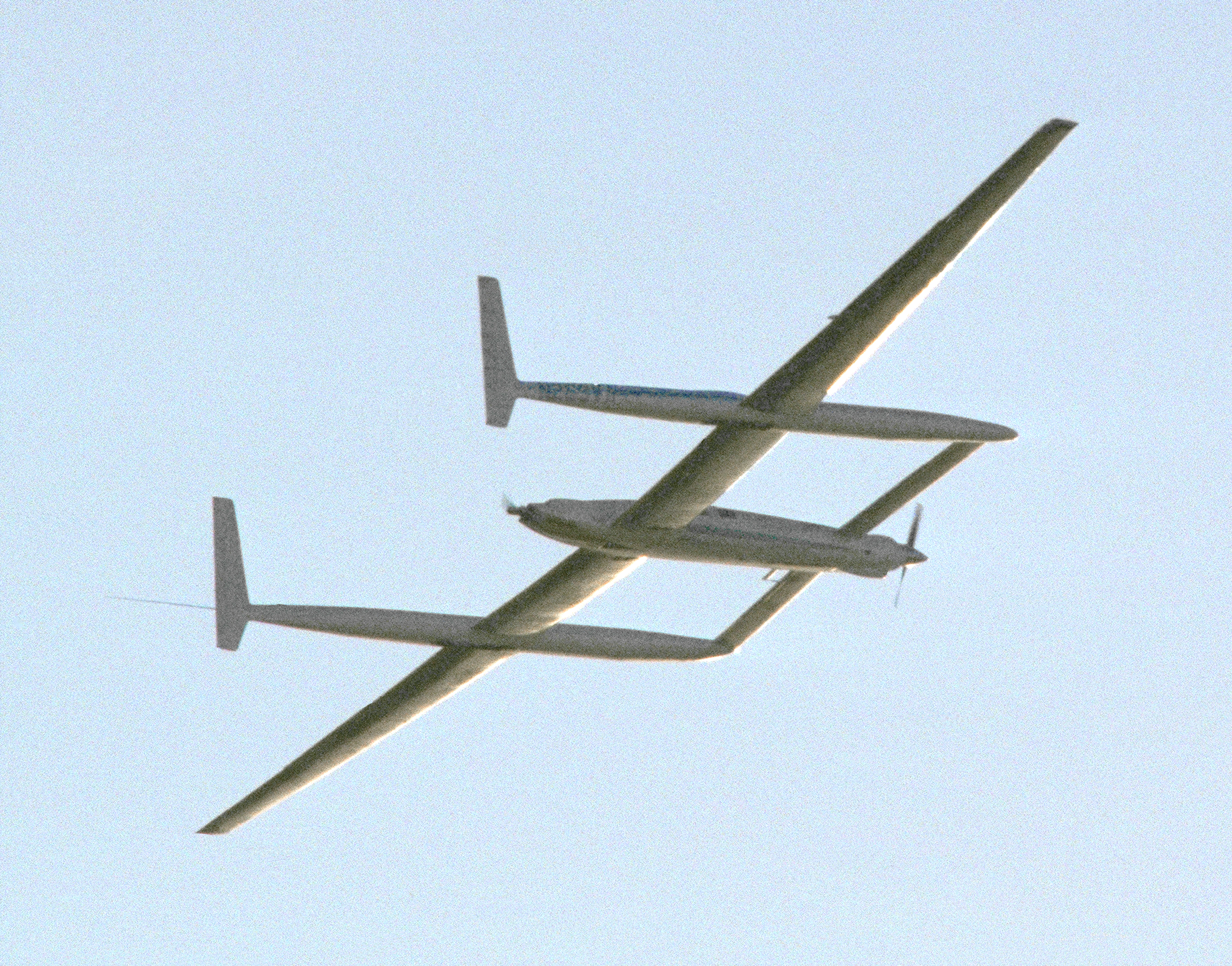
Model 76 Voyager

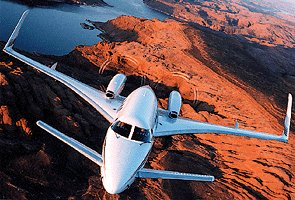
Beechcraft 2000 Starship, based upon the Model 115

=== Other aircraft projects ===
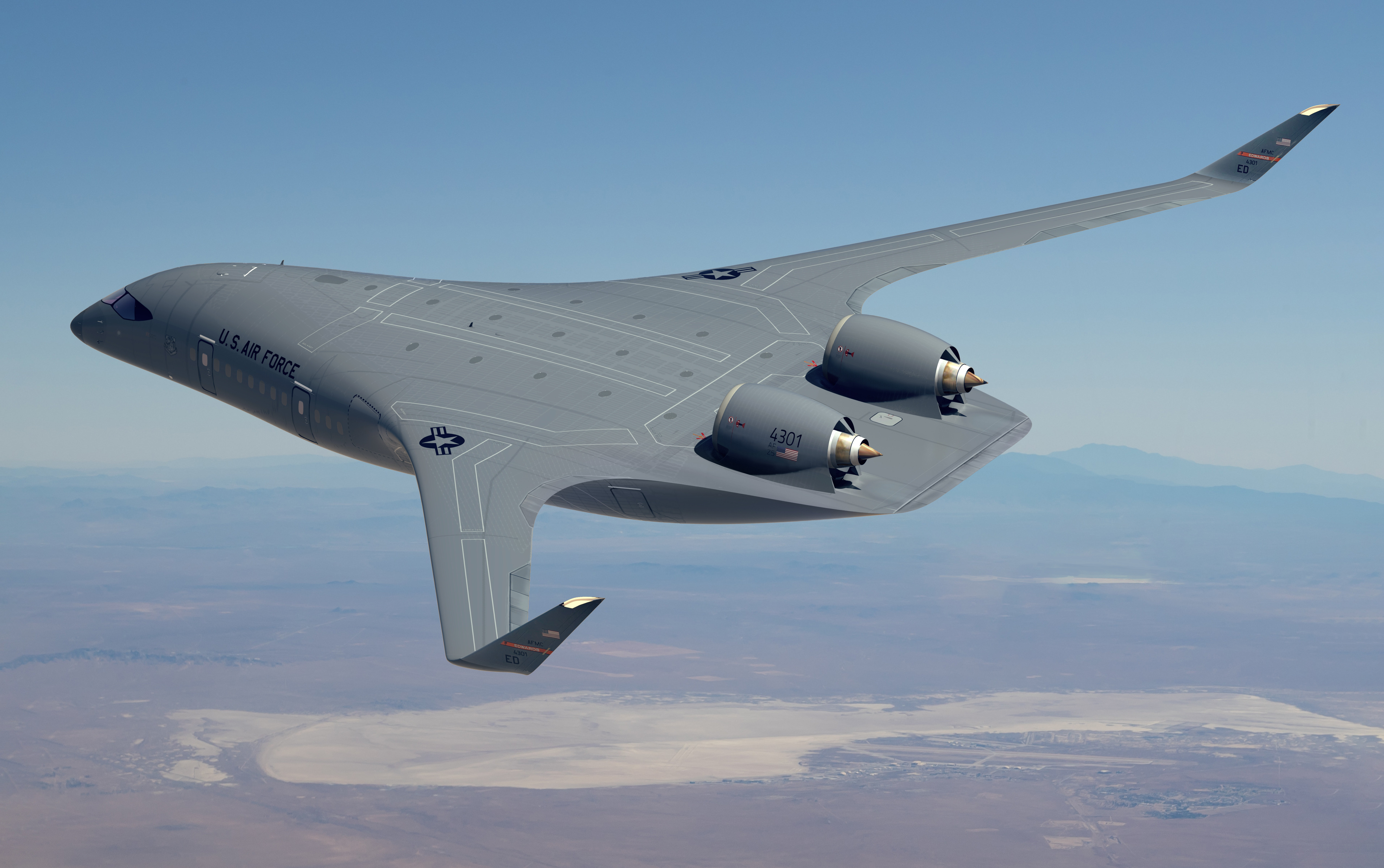
A rendering of the US Air Force blended wing body aircraft project; 4-year contract awarded to JetZero in August 2023, will be built in collaboration with Northrop Grumman subsidiary Scaled Composites

- US flight based testing and evaluation of the GippsAero GA8 Airvan manufactured by GippsAero of Victoria, Australia, including flight evaluation of the external belly cargo pod.
- Scaled Composites will work with JetZero in helping to develop a prototype blended wing body Z-5 demonstrator tanker aircraft Next Generation Air-Refueling System (NGAS) for the US Air Force.

== Non-aircraft work ==
- Stars & Stripes: The catamaran that formed Dennis Conner's American entry for the America's Cup yacht race (1988)
- Power Augmented Ram Landing Craft (PARLC): For the U.S. Navy
- General Motors Ultralite (1992)

== Accidents and incidents ==
- On July 26, 2007, an explosion occurred during testing of SpaceShipTwo's systems, killing three employees and injuring three more.
- On October 31, 2014, the SpaceShipTwo VSS Enterprise broke apart during an in-flight powered test. The accident killed one pilot and severely injured the other, resulting in the total loss of the vehicle; both pilots were Scaled Composites employees. On July 28, 2015, the NTSB released the final report on its investigation of the incident, concluding that for an unknown reason the copilot had released the "Feather" of SpaceShipTwo prematurely, leading directly to the craft's disintegration.

== See also ==
- NewSpace
