= Scaled Composites Proteus =

Experimental aircraft

Proteus
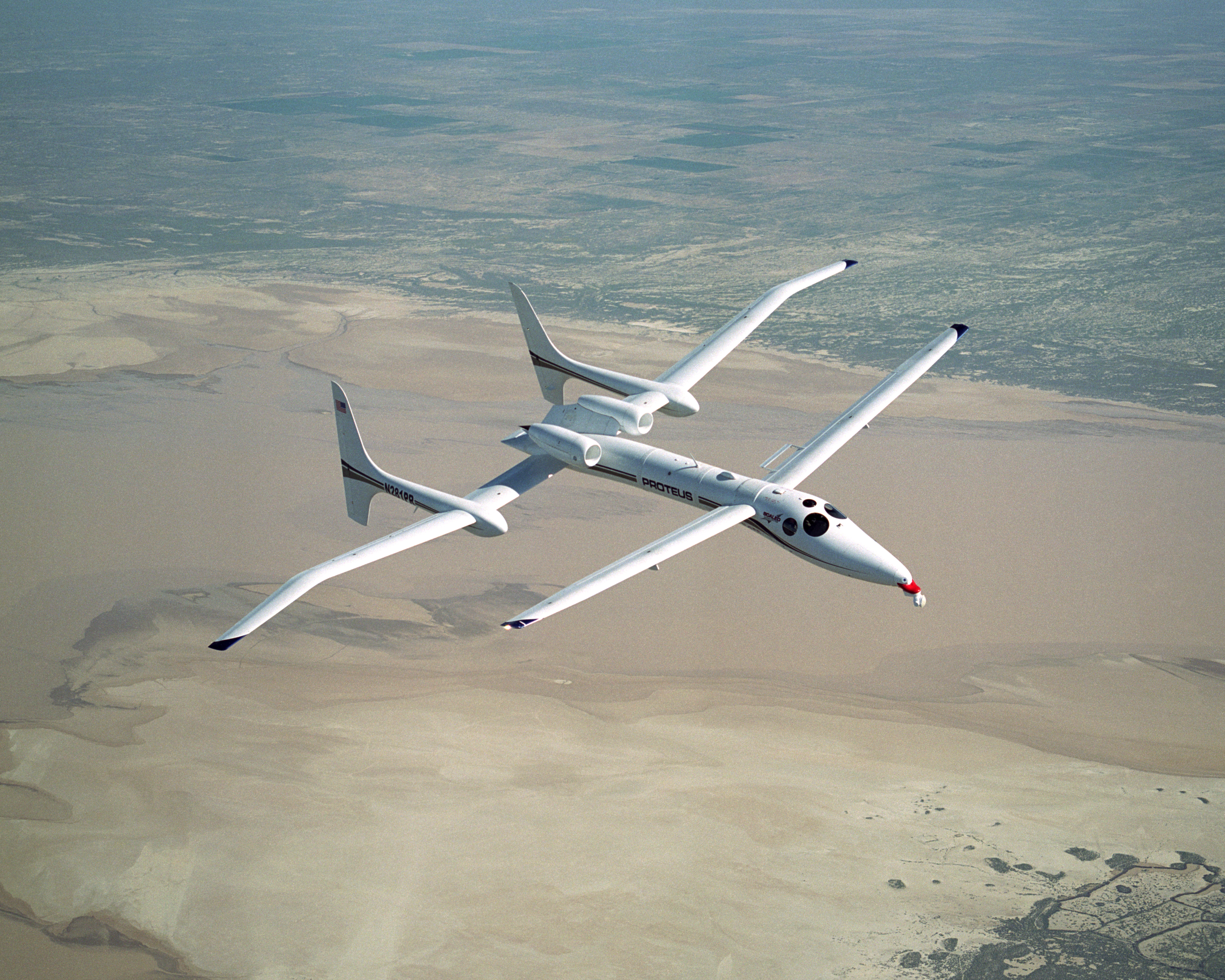

General information
- Type: Experimental aircraft
- Manufacturer: Scaled Composites
- Designer: Burt Rutan
- Status: In service
- Number built: 1

History
- First flight: July 26, 1998; 28 years ago
- Developed into: Scaled Composites White Knight

The Scaled Composites Model 281 Proteus is a tandem-wing high-altitude long-endurance aircraft designed by Burt Rutan to investigate the use of aircraft as high-altitude telecommunications relays. The Proteus is a multi-mission vehicle able to carry various payloads on a ventral pylon. The Proteus has an extremely efficient design and can orbit a point at over 19,800 m for more than 18 hours. It is currently owned by Northrop Grumman.

== Design and development ==
Proteus has an all-composite airframe with graphite-epoxy sandwich construction. Its wingspan of 77 feet 7 inches (23.65 m) is expandable to 92 feet (28 m) with removable wingtips installed. Proteus is an "optionally piloted" aircraft ordinarily flown by two pilots in a pressurized cabin. However, it also has the capability to perform its missions semi-autonomously or flown remotely from the ground. Under NASA's Environmental Research Aircraft and Sensor Technology (ERAST) project, NASA's Dryden Flight Research Center assisted Scaled Composites in developing a sophisticated station-keeping autopilot system and a satellite communications (SATCOM)-based uplink-downlink data system for Proteus' performance and payload data. The Proteus wing was adapted for use on the Model 318 White Knight carrier aircraft, which is the launch system for Rutan's Tier One spacecraft and the DARPA X-37.

Flight testing of the Proteus began with its first flight on July 26, 1998, at the Mojave Airport and continued through the end of 1999. In June, Proteus was deployed internationally for the first time, debuting at the Paris Air Show. It was flown non-stop from Bangor, Maine to Paris. During the week-long show, it flew each day, demonstrating its capabilities as a telecommunications platform.

The Proteus is the current holder of a number of FAI world records for altitude (class: C1-e: landplanes 3,000–6,000 kg, Group: 3, turbojet), set in cooperation with NASA Dryden. The highest altitude achieved was 63,245 feet (19,277 m) in October 2000.

Proteus was included in the list of the "100 Best of 1998 Design", by Time magazine, December 21, 1998.

== Operational history ==
Due to the multimission nature of the aircraft, it has been involved in a number of significant research projects and missions. Scaled Composites, a wholly owned subsidiary of Northrop Grumman, actively markets the aircraft as a research platform, and has published a user's guide for planning proposed missions.

=== Angel Technologies HALO ===
Proteus was originally conceived as a high-altitude, long operation (HALO) telecommunications platform. Proteus was to be the first of a series of aircraft built by Scaled Technology Works of Montrose, Colorado (a proposed spinoff of Scaled Composites which was later cancelled). The aircraft was intended to carry a 14-foot (4.3 m) antenna, which was flight tested in the autumn of 1999 and the summer of 2000, including the relay of a video conference while the aircraft orbited over Los Angeles. The project failed to move forward, however, and the subsequent series of aircraft were not built.

=== ARTIS camera ===
A small Airborne Real-Time Imaging System (ARTIS) camera, developed by HyperSpectral Sciences, Inc., under NASA's ERAST project, was demonstrated during the summer of 1999 when it took visual and near-infrared photos from Proteus while it was flying high over the Experimental Aircraft Association's AirVenture 99 Airshow at Oshkosh, Wisconsin. The images were displayed on a computer monitor at the show only moments after they were taken.

=== NAST validation ===
Proteus' first science mission was to carry the National Polar-Orbiting Operational Environmental Satellite System Airborne Sounder Testbed – Interferometer (NAST-I) instrument in March 2000 during the Cloud-Intensive Operating Period over the Department of Energy Cloud and Radiation Testbed (CART) site. The flights, based out of Stilwell, Oklahoma, encompassed 30 flight hours over a week and a half, characterizing cloud properties and validating the instrument.

Then, in September and October 2000, during the Water-Vapor Intensive Operating Period, Proteus and NAST flew validation flights studying upper tropospheric water vapor and performing underflights of the Terra satellite.

=== ARM-FIRE AFWEX project ===
In November–December 2000, Proteus flew as part of the DOE's Atmospheric Radiation Measurement (ARM) program and their water vapor experiments. Flights were essentially the same as was flown for the NAST Water-Vapor Intensive Operating Period validation flights.

=== NASA TRACE-P ===
As part of the TRACE-P (Transport and Chemical Evolution over the Pacific) mission, Proteus once again carried the NAST pod during March 2001. The aircraft logged 126 flight hours, and was variously based out of Alaska, Hawaii and Japan, gathering data in coordination with ground, balloon and satellite sensor packages over the North Pole in March 2001.

=== NASA CLAMS ===
Proteus took part in the NASA Chesapeake Lighthouse & Aircraft Measurements for Satellites (CLAMS) program in July and August 2001, flying out of NASA's Wallops Flight Facility. The project used a number of different aircraft to develop methods of measuring ocean characteristics, and estimates of aerosols.

=== Airborne laser target ===
In February 2002, Proteus carried a 30-foot-long (9.1 m) pod which served as a target for development of the Boeing YAL-1 Airborne Laser system. The pod housed an array of over 2000 small holes containing optical sensors to detect the laser system. Due to scheduling constraints with other Proteus customers, the Airborne Laser never conducted an actual flight test with the Proteus target system. A target system was designed and integrated into the NKC-135 Big Crow aircraft and used for the majority of Airborne Laser testing.

=== ERAST DSA system ===
In March 2002, NASA Dryden, in cooperation with New Mexico State University's Technical Analysis and Applications Center (TAAC), the FAA and several other entities, conducted flight demonstrations of an active detect, see and avoid (DSA) system for potential application to unmanned aerial vehicles (UAVs) out of Las Cruces, New Mexico. This was a part of the NASA ERAST Project. Proteus was flown as a surrogate UAV controlled remotely from the ground, although safety pilots were aboard to handle takeoff and landing and any potential emergencies. Three other aircraft, ranging from general aviation aircraft to a NASA F/A-18, served as "cooperative" target aircraft with an operating transponder. In each of 18 different scenarios, a Goodrich Skywatch HP Traffic Advisory System (TAS) on the Proteus detected approaching air traffic on potential collision courses, including several scenarios with two aircraft approaching from different directions. The remote pilot then directed Proteus to turn, climb or descend as needed to avoid the potential threat.

In April 2003, a second series of flight demonstrations focusing on "non-cooperative" aircraft (those without operating transponders), was conducted in restricted airspace near Mojave, California, again using the Proteus as a surrogate UAV. Proteus was equipped with a small Amphitech OASys 35 GHz primary radar system to detect potential intruder aircraft on simulated collision courses. The radar data was sent directly to the ground station as well as via an Inmarsat satellite system installed on Proteus. A mix of seven intruder aircraft, ranging from a sailplane to a high-speed jet, flew 20 scenarios over a four-day period, one or two aircraft at a time. In each case, the radar picked up the intruding aircraft at ranges from 2.5 to 6.5 miles (10.5 km), depending on the intruder's radar signature. Proteus' remote pilot on the ground was able to direct Proteus to take evasive action if needed.

=== IHOP 2002 ===
The International H2O Project (IHOP 2002) was a field experiment which took place over the Southern Great Plains of the United States from May 13 to June 25, 2002. The chief aim of IHOP 2002 was improved characterization of the four-dimensional (4-D) distribution of water vapor and its application to improving the understanding and prediction of convection. The NASA Holographic Airborne Rotating Lidar Instrument Experiment was flown as a part of this project. Flights were performed in coordination with Lockheed P-3 and DC-8 aircraft.

=== NASA Crystal-FACE ===
In July 2002, Proteus participated in Crystal-FACE, measuring tropical cirrus clouds, operating from Key West, Florida, flying as far south as Belize. For this phase of the project, the aircraft was configured with 10-foot (3.0 m) canards and 13 1/2-foot wingtip extensions.

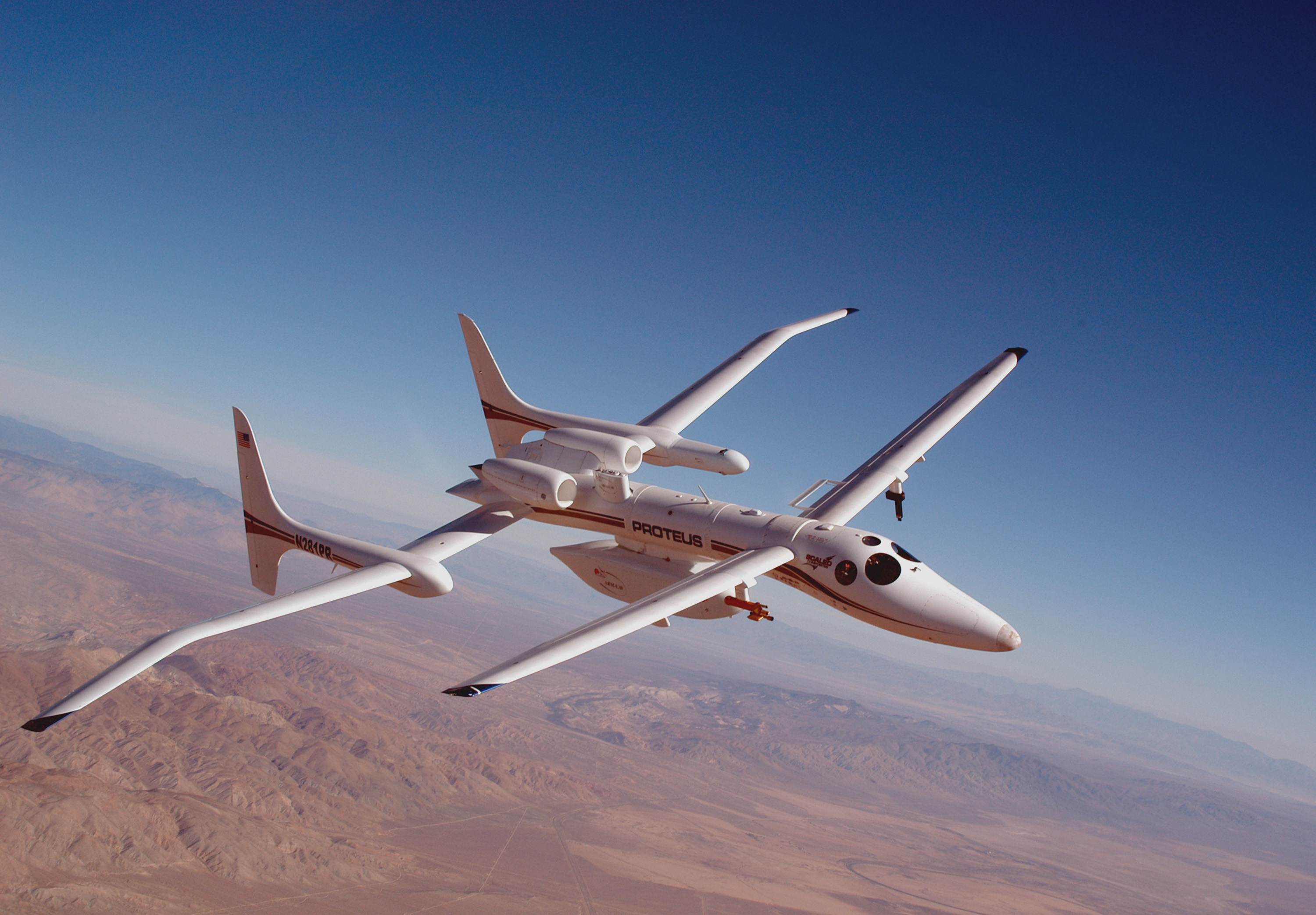
Proteus in flight in 2002 in the Department of Energy's Atmospheric Radiation Measurement – Unmanned Aerial Vehicle (ARM-UAV) Program

=== ARM-UAV ===
Proteus has been used in a number of deployments as a part of a project sponsored by the DOE's Atmospheric Radiation Measurement program and the Sandia National Laboratories to study cirrus clouds in the upper atmosphere.

=== Space trapeze ===
In May and June 2005, Transformational Space Corp., or t/Space, flight tested their rocket release concept utilizing Scaled Composites' Proteus. A captive-carry test flight was performed on May 13, and the rocket mockup was dropped three times, on May 24, June 7 and June 14, over Edwards AFB. The mockup was a 23% scale model of a proposed four-person crew capsule (called the CXV) and its AirLaunch LLC-produced QuickReach II booster. These particular flight tests were to demonstrate the concept of t/Space's Trapeze/Lanyard (TLAD) air drop system.

=== Model 395 development ===
Northrop Grumman is using the Proteus to research new UAV technologies, as it can be controlled from the cockpit, a ground control station, or operate semi-autonomously. Scaled, in partnership with Northrop Grumman, is offering a fully uncrewed version of the Proteus, labeled Model 395, as part of the competition for the USAF Hunter-Killer competition. If selected, that product would have been flown in 2007.

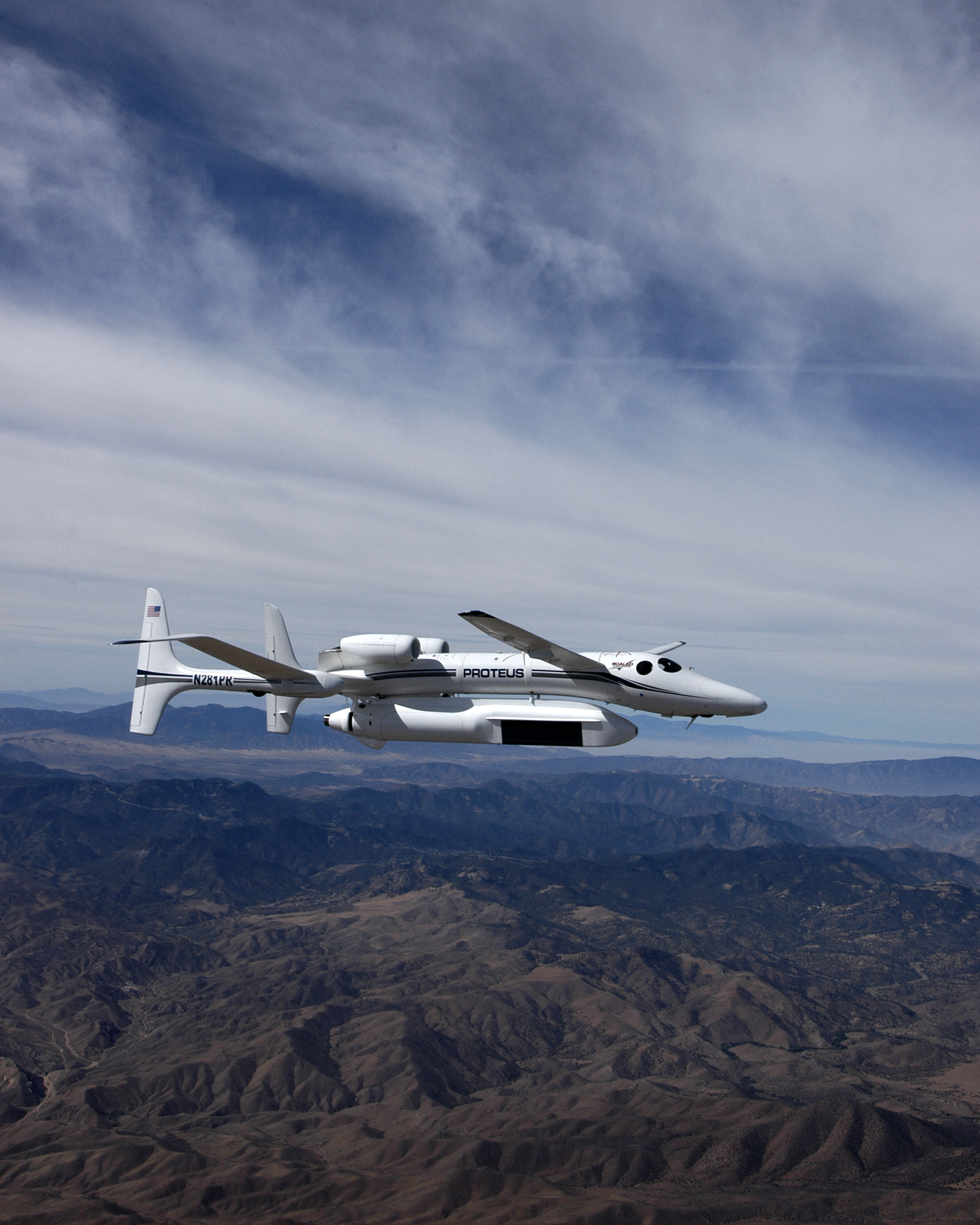
Proteus flies over the Tehachapi Mountains with the MP-RTIP radar pod

On February 24, 2005, Proteus became Scaled's first bomber with the release of an inert 500-pound weapon over Nellis Air Force Base in Nevada.

=== Global Hawk radar ===
On April 27, 2006, Proteus flight tested a large pod designed to house a developmental version of the Multi-Platform Radar Technology Insertion Program, or MP-RTIP. This is a long range, high resolution air-to-ground and air-to-air synthetic aperture radar system being developed for use on the RQ-4 Global Hawk. This pod is, by function of its length and frontal area, one of the largest payloads carried by Proteus to date. Actual flight testing of the MP-RTIP system began in late September 2006, with initial flight reaching 100 knots (120 mph; 190 km/h) and 22,000 feet (6,700 m) altitude.

== World records ==
Proteus has set several world altitude records in FAI Class C-1e (Landplanes: takeoff weight 3,000 to 6,000 kg (6,600 to 13,200 lb)), Group 2, turbojet, including:

- Altitude: piloted by Mike Melvill and Robert Waldmiller, 19,277 m (63,245 ft), October 25, 2000.
- Altitude in horizontal flight: piloted by Mike Melvill and Robert Waldmiller, 19,015 m (62,385 ft), October 25, 2000.
- Altitude with 1,000 kg (2,200 lb) payload: piloted by Mike Melvill and Robert Waldmiller, 17,067 m (55,994 ft), October 27, 2000.

== Specifications (Proteus) ==
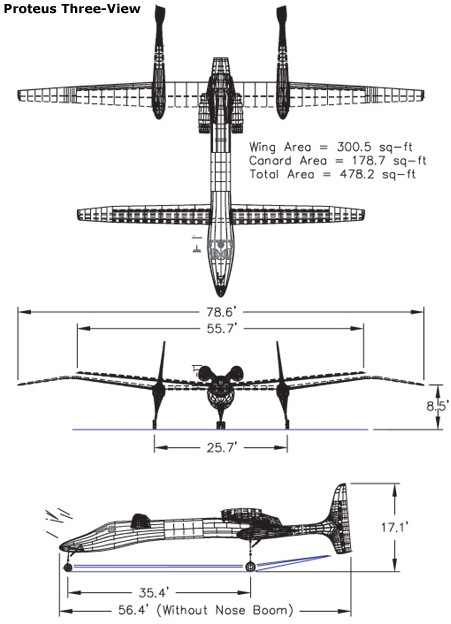
Orthographically projected diagram of the Scaled Composites Proteus

Data from Jane's All the World's Aircraft 2003–2004

General characteristics

- Crew: Two (pilot and co-pilot)
- Length: 56 ft 4 in (17.17 m)
- Wingspan: 77 ft 7 in (23.65 m)
- Height: 17 ft 8 in (5.38 m)
- Wing area: 300.5 sq ft (27.92 m^{2})
- Empty weight: 5,860 lb (2,658 kg)
- Max takeoff weight: 12,500 lb (5,670 kg)
- Powerplant: 2 × Williams FJ44-2 turbofans, 2,293 lbf (10.20 kN) thrust each

Performance

- Maximum speed: 313 mph (504 km/h, 272 kn)
- Cruise speed: 219 mph (352 km/h, 190 kn) at 20000 ft
- Endurance: 14 hours at 1,150 miles (1,850 km) from base
- Service ceiling: 61,000 ft (19,000 m) mid-mission altitude
- Rate of climb: 3,400 ft/min (17 m/s)

== See also ==
Related development

- Scaled Composites Stratolaunch
- Scaled Composites White Knight
