= Museum of Art and Digital Entertainment =

Museum in Oakland, California

Museum of Art and Digital Entertainment (The MADE)

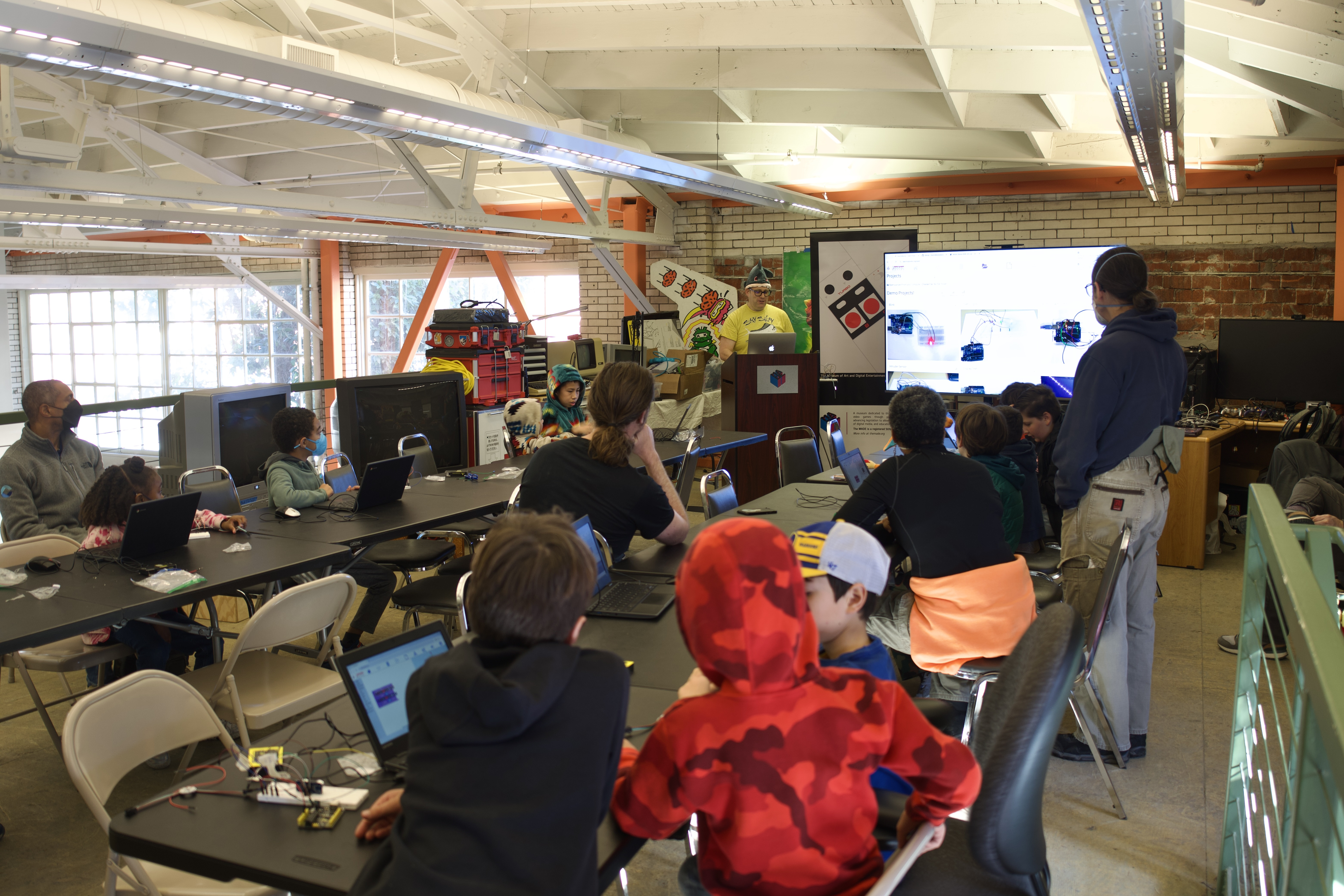
- A Saturday morning class at the MADE where students get free admission to the playable exhibit floor after class
- Established: 2010
- Location: Oakland, California, US
- Coordinates: 37.80217243187641°N 122.27327765569068°W
- Collections: video games, digital media concept art, and gaming systems to teach the public about digital art, and the process of gaming creation
- Collection size: 60,000+ artifacts
- Founder: Alex Handy
- Director: Rachel Heleva
- Chairperson: Sarah Levantine
- Historian: Rob Curl
- Public transit access: 12th Street Station
- Website: themade.org

The Museum of Art and Digital Entertainment (stylized as The MADE) is a museum in Oakland, California dedicated to digital art and gaming, with fully playable gaming exhibits. Its mission is to inspire the next generation of digital creators through playable preservation.

The museum houses a video game collection spanning over 40 gaming systems and 14,000 games.

The board of directors and Board of Advisors are composed largely of veterans of the gaming industry, journalists, experts, and historians of the field. The museum was founded by the internationally published technology journalist Alex Handy, with Henry Lowood, curator of Stanford University History of Science & Technology Collections and Film & Media Collections serving on the board of directors.

In September 2015, the museum launched a Kickstarter campaign to acquire a venue in San Francisco, California, across the bay.

In June 2022, after being closed for two years due to the COVID-19 pandemic, the museum reopened in a new location in downtown Oakland under the leadership of the new executive director, Shem Nguyen.

In July 2024, the museum's board of directors hired its first full-time executive director, Mason Young.

== MADE Classroom: Digital Creation and Critique ==
The MADE offers a free programming workshop every Saturday morning using their collection in addition to the Scratch to explore game design and development topics. Students have a choice of signing up for a class on video game programming, computer art, or both. No programming experience is required and a new student can join any session. The MADE requires that a student be at least 9 years old to participate in the workshop.

== History ==
In July 2008, Alex Handy discovered a collection of EPROMs for the Atari and ColecoVision at the Laney College flea market. These EPROMs held various revisions of the games at different stages of their development. Recognizing the importance of these artifacts as an early example of game development iteration, Handy organized a group of volunteers to exhibit the start of the museum's collection at GDC 2011 to advertise their first Kickstarter. The MADE printed and displayed a large poster outlining the lineage of video game companies in the industry, and professionals signed next to the places where they worked. After running a successful Kickstarter campaign, volunteers initially scouted a space at 3rd and Market, former sight of William Hearst's offices and the site of the original printing presses for the San Francisco Chronicle.

In August 2011, the MADE approached City Council member Libby Schaaf to secure a location for the museum. They direct the museum to Phil Tagami's space at 610 16th Street, and the museum entered into a lease agreement to rent out the second floor of the space. They shared their floor with other non-profits, such as the Mongolian Cultural Center and local court-mandated anger-management and parenting classes. Upon IDG Media's closure of GamePro after 20+ years of continuous publication, the entirety of the GamePro Collection was donated to the MADE. It currently forms the basis of the MADE's collection. In November 2011, the MADE opened with a 3D exhibit, a symposium by RJ Mical, and free Scratch programming classes for kids. Will Wright, the creator of Sim City, donated to the museum, with his wife Anya Wright joining the board of directors. The MADE's oldest group, the Interactive Fiction Club held its first meeting.

In 2013, the MADE began its work on its first act of digital preservation beyond uploading lost 1996 GamePro TV episodes to YouTube. The MADE, in partnership with Chip Morningstar, F. Randall Farmer, and Fujitsu, undertook the preservation of Habitat, the world's first graphical MMO, originally released in 1986 for the Commodore 64. This led to the museum's effort in January 2015 in partnership with the EFF, Stanford, MIT, Archive.org and many game developers to change copyright law. This exemption allowed players to circumvent digital copyright protection when online game validation servers had expired, allowing online validation servers of single-player games to be circumvented so players could continue to play games they had paid for long after the companies behind them had expired. This change in copyright law enabled legal framework to deploy a playable version of Habitat to the online community.

In June 2015, the ceiling collapsed in the MADE's classroom, leading to a relocation effort. The MADE launched its second Kickstarter to move into a 4000 square foot ground floor retail location. It achieved its $50k goal ultimately moving to 3400 Broadway in downtown Oakland. The museum reopened its doors to the public at its new location in February 2016, resuming all previous events, exhibitions, and classes. Neohabitat, the effort to digitally preserve Habitat, was released to the general public, and all related source code was open sourced under the MIT license.

In March 2020, the MADE was forced to close down due to the COVID-19 pandemic and the ensuing shelter in place orders from the local and federal government. After arriving at an impasse with its new landlords, the MADE began moving its collection into a temporary storage location in West Oakland. Video game documentary creators NoClip featured the museum in one of their videos, helping to raise awareness and fund the museum's ability to maintain its collection in light of the loss in operational revenue. Museum volunteers started the MADECast, a podcast that featured discussions on video game development, play, and preservation with luminaries across a wide swath of digital entertainment content topics. Guests included Tim Schafer, Ron Gilbert, Roberta Williams, and the MADE's volunteers.

In the fall of 2021, Shem Nguyen became the executive director of the MADE, with Alex Handy stepping into the role of board president. The MADE brought its collection out for the first time since the beginning of the COVID pandemic to East Oakland's Little Saigon district for a summer festival.

In May 2022, the MADE secured a lease agreement with EBALDC (East Bay Asian Local Development Corporation) to reopen at 921 Washington Street. A month later, that June, the MADE hosted its reopening party. Matt Householder, the producer of Diablo II, attended, and signed a copy of Diablo on the shelf and tells stories about its production. Over a hundred visitors attended.

In July 2024, Alex Handy resigned as board president while staying on the board as an advisor and founder emeritus. Shem Nguyen resigned as the executive director and is voted into the role of board president. The board successfully voted to hire its first full-time executive director, Mason Young.

In February 2025, NHK World broadcast an episode about the history of gaming featuring MADE historian Rob Curl.

== NeoHabitat ==
NeoHabitat is an open source project headed by The MADE to revive and restore Habitat to its original state from 1986. The project is hosted on GitHub and is in need of volunteers.

== Events ==
Game jams, speaker series, and Super Smash Bros tournaments are regularly hosted by the MADE.

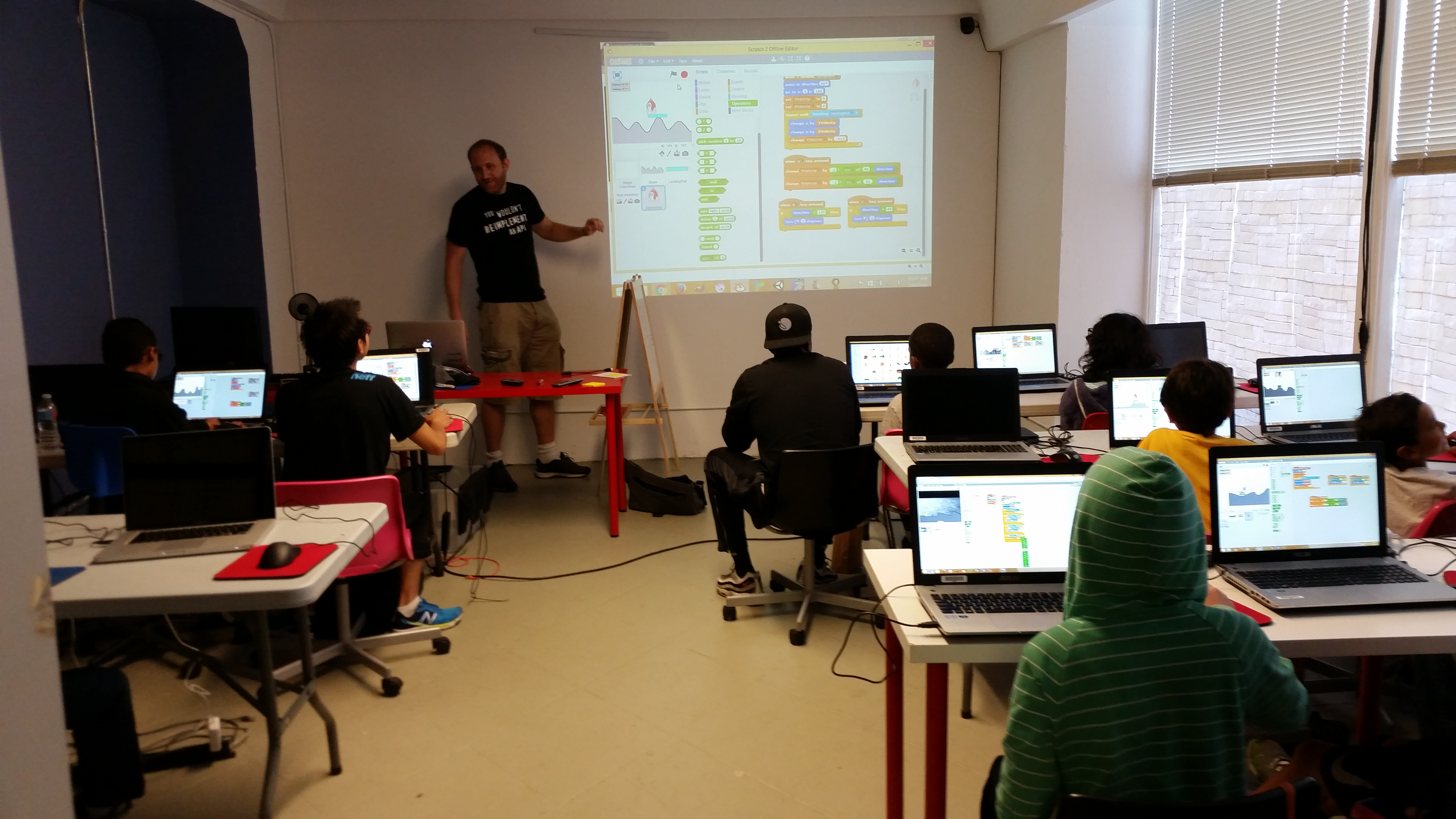
A Scratch programming workshop at The MADE.
