= Starstruck (company) =

American hybrid-propellant rocket company

Starstruck Inc. was a company cofounded by James Bennett and Phil Salin that attempted to perform low-cost orbital rocket launches using experimental, sea-launched hybrid rockets. While a commercial failure, it is an important part of hybrid rocket history, responsible for restarting commercial development of hybrid rockets. One of its core leadership was former first Apple CEO Michael Scott. It was based in Redwood City, California.

The company folded after three rockets were built and one was successfully launched to suborbital space. Several veterans of Starstruck founded the American Rocket Company (AMROC), which also eventually failed. AMROC's intellectual property was acquired by SpaceDev.

== Sources ==
1. Jim Schefter. (May 1984) High-tech Rockets on the Cheap. Popular Science

== See also ==
SeaLaunch
