= James Benson =

American aerospace engineer

- Born: Kansas City, Missouri
- Died: October 10, 2008 (aged 63)
- Education: University of Missouri-Kansas City
- Occupations: American aerospace entrepreneur Founder of SpaceDev

James William Benson (April 3, 1945 – October 10, 2008) was an American aerospace entrepreneur who founded SpaceDev, a commercial satellite and satellite component development company, and the Benson Space Company, a civilian spaceflight venture focused on commercial space tourism.

== Early life and education ==
Benson was born and raised in Kansas City, Missouri, where he earned a Bachelor of Science degree in Geology from the University of Missouri–Kansas City.

== Career ==
He spent 30 years associated with the computer field, spanning the era from the introduction of modern mainframe computers to the dominance of the computer industry by microcomputers. Benson's partner Hal Woodward invented modern full text computer indexing and searching in 1981 based on the Federal Acquisition Regulation – the search system was called FARA (FAR Automated), and Benson exploited the new field through companies he co-founded. Benson was active in the early days of Internet Relay Chat (IRC). In the early 1990s, he assembled a large collection of help files that became the predecessor to today's IRChelp.org.

Benson was a founding member of the Personal Spaceflight Federation. Benson was on the board of directors of the California Space Authority from 2005 to 2007 was named one of the "50 People to Watch in 2005" by San Diego magazine, and was named 2005 "Alumnus of the Year" by the University of Missouri at Kansas City. He founded the non-profit Space Development Institute, and introduced the Benson Prize for Amateur Discovery of Near Earth Objects. Benson was Vice-Chairman and private sector representative on NASA's national Space Grant Review Panel.

=== SpaceDev ===
After a successful career as a computer industry entrepreneur, Benson decided to take on the challenge of starting a space commercialization venture. It combined his lifelong interests in science, technology and astronomy with his successful business experience.

Benson started the trend of successful high tech entrepreneurs moving into the space development arena, by incorporating SpaceDev, Inc. as a publicly owned space exploration and development company in 1997.

Benson and SpaceDev worked to develop the world's first private sector enterprise to profitably explore and develop space beyond earth orbit. SpaceDev's mission is to help "make space happen" for all of humanity, through the development of a comprehensive private space program, by delivering affordable and practical space technologies, products and solutions to SpaceDev's government and commercial customers, while creating value for SpaceDev stockholders.

Benson searched NASA's archives and "saw the HL-20's potential as a project that had already received huge amounts of development money. [The vehicle had] friendly flying characteristics combined with a thick pedigree of expensive studies." SpaceDev licensed the HL-20 technology from NASA and extended it to use for its new Dream Chaser suborbital spacecraft. Later, the Dream Chaser became a candidate for NASA's Commercial Orbital Transportation Services (COTS) Program for delivering cargo to and from the International Space Station. In the event, SpaceDev was not selected for award under COTS, but did sign a non-reimburseable Space Act Agreement to facilitate additional exchange of non-cash project milestones with NASA.

Afterwards, Benson stepped down as Chairman of SpaceDev and founded the Benson Space Company to pursue the Dream Chaser project. "In the fall of 2007, Benson Space announced a partnership with United Launch Alliance to turn the Dream Chaser into an orbital vehicle by launching it on an Atlas V rocket. Benson and his team were going to try to go all the way to orbit."

SpaceDev acquired the former Integrated Space Systems, a space systems engineering firm, in 1998.

In 1998, SpaceDev and its chairman James Benson were named in an administrative proceeding alleging securities fraud. The SEC alleged that SpaceDev and chairman Benson made false and misleading statements through various media in an attempt to increase its stock value. A settlement was later agreed upon that states that the SEC was founded in its allegations and SpaceDev cease and desist from committing or causing violations or future violations of Section 17(a) of the Securities Act and Section 10(b) of the Exchange Act and Rule 10b-5 thereunder; and Mr. Benson cease and desist from committing or causing violations or future violations of Section 17(a) of the Securities Act and Section 10(b) of the Exchange Act and Rule 10b-5 thereunder.

SpaceDev acquired the intellectual property of American Rocket Company in 1999 after AMROC's 1996 bankruptcy. The AMROC-derived hybrid rocket motors were used in several SpaceDev projects that followed.

SpaceDev started developing the science mission CHIPSat for the University of California, Berkeley in 1999. In 2003, SpaceDev launched the United States' smallest, low-cost, high performance satellite named CHIPSat for NASA. CHIPSat is a suitcase-size science microsatellite that is also the first U.S. mission to use only TCP/IP Internet communications for end-to-end satellite operations control, becoming the first satellite whose mission control and operations center is any laptop computer located anywhere in the world. Although the nominal mission duration was one year, the satellite operated successfully for almost five years when mission was terminated in April 2008.

In 2004, SpaceDev's hybrid rocket motors were used by Burt Rutan's SpaceShipOne to win the $10 million Ansari X Prize.

During his 10 years with the company, Benson served as founder, chairman, chief executive officer and chief technology officer of SpaceDev. He stepped down on September 28, 2006 to announce that he was starting a new venture called Benson Space Company.

=== Benson Space Company ===
Jim Benson announced on September 28, 2006 that he had launched an ambitious new venture focused on commercial space tourism, Benson Space Company (BSC).

As of 2006, Benson Space stated intentions to be first to market in the emerging multibillion-dollar space tourism or personal spaceflight industry, with the safest and lowest cost astronaut-making suborbital missions.

"I am dedicated to opening space for all of humanity and, with SpaceDev well-managed and growing, I plan to spend the next several years creating the possibility that anyone who wants to go to space will be able to, safely and affordably," said Benson in September, 2006. SpaceDev owns many of the patents and intellectual property rights associated with hybrid rocket motors used for safe human spaceflight. Under Benson's guidance, SpaceDev developed critical hybrid rocket motor technology and furnished all of the rocket motors for Paul Allen's SpaceShipOne, the craft that earned the $10 million Ansari X Prize in 2004.

Benson Space had completed its first round of financing and submitted a request for proposal to SpaceDev for the design and development of its SpaceDev Dream Chaser spaceships. BSC expected to be one of SpaceDev's largest customers, purchasing multiple spaceships and safe hybrid rocket motors for use in personal spaceflight. However, Jim Benson's illness and death led to the dissolution of the company.

== Death ==
SpaceDev announced on October 10, 2008, that James Benson had died earlier that day at his home in Poway, California. He had been diagnosed with Glioblastoma multiforme, a type of brain tumor, in the spring of 2008.
