= Phil Salin =

American economist (1950–1991)

Phillip Kenneth Salin
- Born: 1949 or 1950
- Died: December 12, 1991 (aged 40–41); Redwood City
- Scientific career
- Fields: economics, computer science
- Website: philsalin.com

Phillip Kenneth Salin (1950–1991) was an American economist and futurist, best known for his contributions to theories about the development of cyberspace and as a proponent of private (non-governmental) space exploration and development.

== Education and early life ==
Salin was born in Hollywood, California and raised in San Rafael, California. Salin's father was Lothar Salin, a psychotherapist and public interest activist in San Rafael. His grandfather was Edgar Salin, an historian/economist/philosopher at Basel, Switzerland and a leader of the so-called "Historical School" of political and social philosophy. Salin earned a Bachelor of Arts in Economics from UCLA in 1970, and a Master of Business Administration from Stanford University. He did postgraduate studies with James G. March at Stanford University. Some of Salin's early work on telecommunications policy started the breakup of AT&T and the deregulation of the field. In the early-70's, Salin worked as a programmer at Bechtel Financing Services, where he invented a precursor of spreadsheet software.

== Space ==
In the 1980s, Salin applied his economics expertise to the problem of access to outer space. He cofounded ARC Technologies/Rocket Company/Starstruck, a private space launch company. On February 28, 1984, Salin testified to the US House Space Science and Applications Subcommittee of the Committee on Science and Technology, stating that NASA had substantially underestimated the cost of its launches and thus was massively subsidizing them, harming other competitors such as the Atlas and Delta rockets. NASA's published cost and price of $71 million per launch contrasted with Salin's calculated costs of $200 to $250 million per launch.

In 1987, Salin and James C. Bennett published "The Private Solution to the Space Transportation Crisis". A NASA bibliography on the Shuttle described it as:

The authors of this lengthy article assert that confused and short-sighted decisions dominated by political expediency have been made about the U.S. space program for the past 30 years. Overly large and ambitious systems have been chosen, resulting in the present crisis in space transportation. The history of commercial aircraft development offers an alternative example of producing a range of sizes and capabilities for a wide variety of users and shows that the space transportation industry could benefit from applying the decision-making processes used in private enterprise. The authors examine strategies for privatization of the Shuttle and conclude that policy support for the commercial launch industry must be continued. NASA must also be reoriented toward its basic research function, and more government services should be bought from the private sector.

== American Information Exchange ==
In 1984 Salin founded the American Information Exchange (AMIX), a network for the buying and selling of information, goods and services. Salin invented the concepts of smart contracts, and buying and selling which are now considered standard ecommerce. AMIX did not patent their inventions. Therefore, the inventions of buying and selling electronically - ecommerce - entered public domain and became the basis for other enterprises such as eBay, Priceline and Amazon.

AMIX struggled to create the infrastructure required to establish an online exchange in an era before the web and the ready availability of online tools, higher bandwidth and graphic interfaces. AMIX folded in 1993 after Salin had died and it was unable to raise additional venture capital. In 1999 Doc Searls told Salon about the challenges Salin faced, "Phil had to create his own Internet. In hindsight, it couldn't be done ... The time really is now. It wasn't then, much as we wanted it to be."

== Political views ==
Salin recognized that the growth in the power of computers and telecommunications, and the reduction in costs would reduce the transaction costs of exchanging knowledge, with strong attendant benefits to humankind. Salin opposed patents on software because of the limitations on free speech and the restrictions patents posed to the growth of knowledge by stopping competition between ideas. He submitted a comment to the US Patent Office to this effect.

Politically, Salin was a libertarian and Austrian economist. He was a science fiction fan, and his major influences and favorite writers included Robert A. Heinlein, Friedrich Hayek, Karl Popper, Ludwig von Mises and other Austrian economists and political philosophers.

== Personal life ==
Salin enjoyed fantasy, collected comic books, and read voluminously in all areas of fantasy and science fiction. He was also a fan of classical music. Salin's wife and business partner in rocket company ARC Technologies and the American Information Exchange (AMiX) was author Gayle Pergamit. He died of stomach cancer in December 1991.
