= HyPrSpace =

French rocket startup company

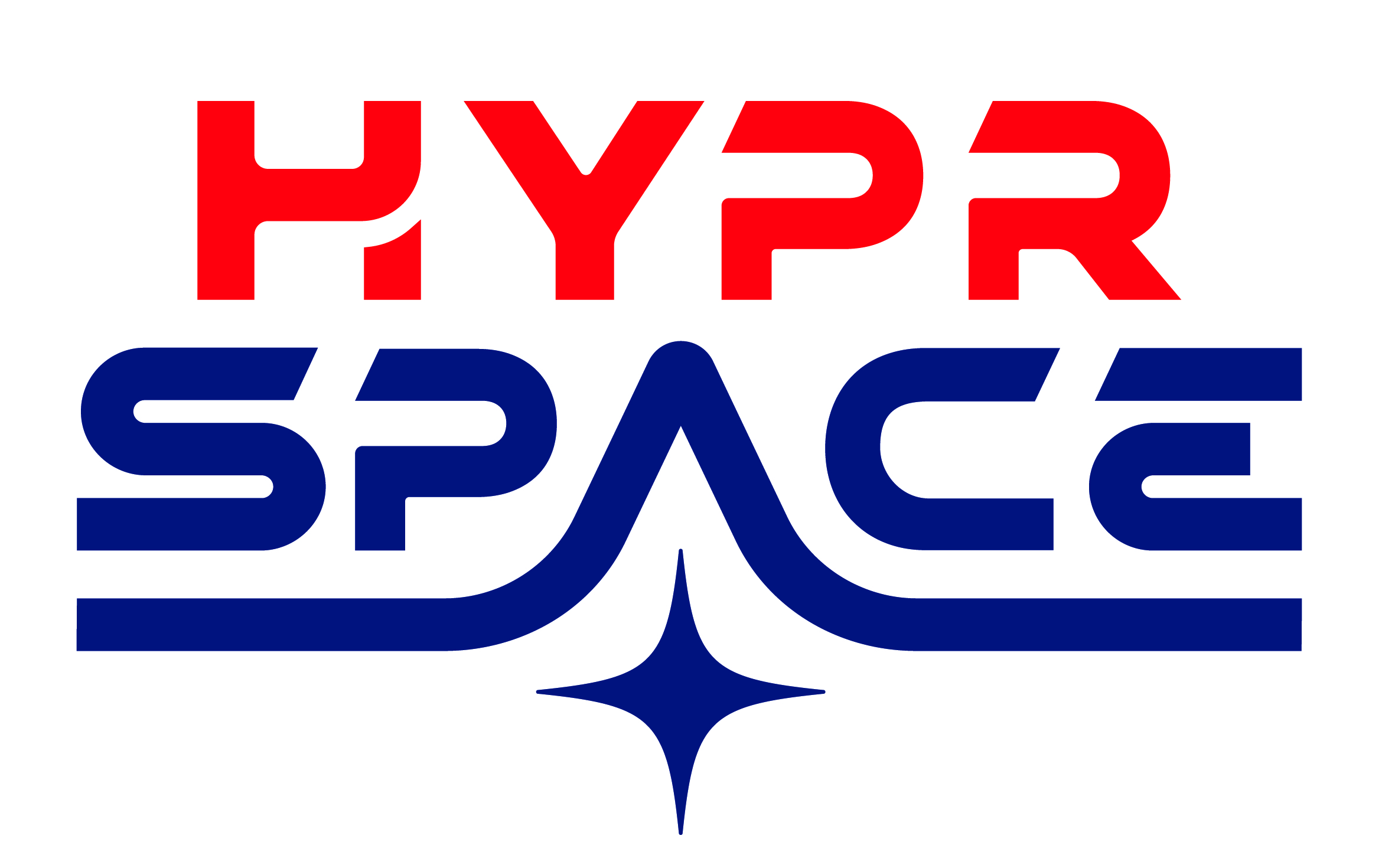
- Industry: Space
- Founded: 2019
- Headquarters: Bordeaux, Nouvelle-Aquitaine, France
- Website: hypr-space.com

HyPrSpace (Hybrid Propulsion for Space) is a rocket startup, founded in 2019, in Bordeaux, Nouvelle-Aquitaine, France. It develops orbital (Orbital Baguette-1/OB-1, pronounced Obi-wan) and suborbital (Baguette One) launch vehicles and hybrid propulsion systems.

== Funding ==
In 2022, the company raised €1.1 million to develop its rocket. In 2024, as part of a consortium with the companies CT Ingénierie, SpaceDreamS, and Telespazio France, it raised €35 million to develop their launcher Orbital Baguette One (the Le Projet Agile de Développement d'Accès à l'espace 1—PADA1—project). Sixty percent of the funding was from the French government as the winner of the France 2030 program supported by the State.

== Rockets ==
Baguette One is a 7 metres tall, single-stage suborbital rocket, with a payload capacity of 300 kilograms. The first suborbital mission is planned for 2027. Baguette One will launch from DGA Essais de missiles, a missile testing site in mainland France. Orbital Baguette-1 (OB-1) is a 16 metres tall micro-launcher with a payload of 250 kg to 400 km low Earth orbit (LEO).

== Engine ==
The hybrid engine uses solid fuels (including HDPE) in combination with a liquid oxidizer and doesn't need a turbo pump. On 11 July 2024, the first hot fire test of its Terminator hybrid rocket engine was completed with success. In December 2024, HyPrSpace announced a successful hot test in the second Terminator testing campaign.

== Further sources ==
- Hillion, Laurine; Parisse, Jean-Denis; Mangeot, Alexandre (2023-06-07). "Preliminary sizing and study of a hybrid rocket based combined cycle". Frontiers in Space Technologies. 4. Bibcode:2023FrST....403981H. doi:10.3389/frspt.2023.1103981. ISSN 2673-5075.
