= AMIX =

AMIX may refer to:

- Amiga Unix, a computer operating system
- American Information Exchange, an early online information marketplace
