= Streaker (rocket) =

The Streaker is a rocket invented by SpaceDev. It is designed to be a low-cost launch vehicle.

== History ==
SpaceDev, the world's first commercial space exploration company, was founded in 1997 by Jim Benson, as a result of a merger between Integrated Space Systems of Southern California and a defunct publicly traded corporate shell. In August 1998 SpaceDev acquired all patents, intellectual property, test results, and documents that had been produced by the bankrupt American Rocket Company (AMROC). Some of these documents would later be used to create the SpaceDev Streaker.

In April 2003, SpaceDev announced the creation of the Streaker as part of a propulsion program based on the hybrid motor of the SpaceShipOne, a vehicle created by Scaled Composites. SpaceDev also received an Air Force Research Laboratory contract to develop the SpaceDev Streaker Hybrid Upper Stage rocket, one of two used in the vehicle. The Streaker was expected to undergo first launch in 2007–08.

== Propulsion method ==
The Streaker is propelled using High Performance Mass Fraction hybrid common core boosters, which will use HTPB and nitrous oxide as fuel. The two motors involved in this system are the Hybrid Upper Stage motor and the SpaceDev Streaker Small Common Booster motor, which will produce 20,000 and 120,000 pounds of thrust respectively. Both motors are used in the SpaceDev Dream Chaser. Other important components include a Common Core Booster and a hybrid transfer stage.

== Design and testing ==
The Streaker is designed to offer quick response launches of payloads in the 1,102-pound class to low Earth orbit but can support loads of up to 2,204 pounds. The goal of the Streaker is to achieve a launch cost of under US$5,000,000 per launch. An additional SpaceDev facility was built in Poway, California in order to design and test the Streaker.

== See also ==
- SpaceDev Dream Chaser
- Trailblazer (satellite)
