= Barbarella (rocket) =

German university project (1974)

Barbarella was the designation of the first German hybrid rocket.

The rocket was named "Barbarella" after the movie of the same name, Barbarella, to differentiate it from other more grandiosely named rockets. Its lettering was a pop art style, unlike the more scientific lettering commonly used on rockets.
