= Chip Morningstar =

American software developer and author

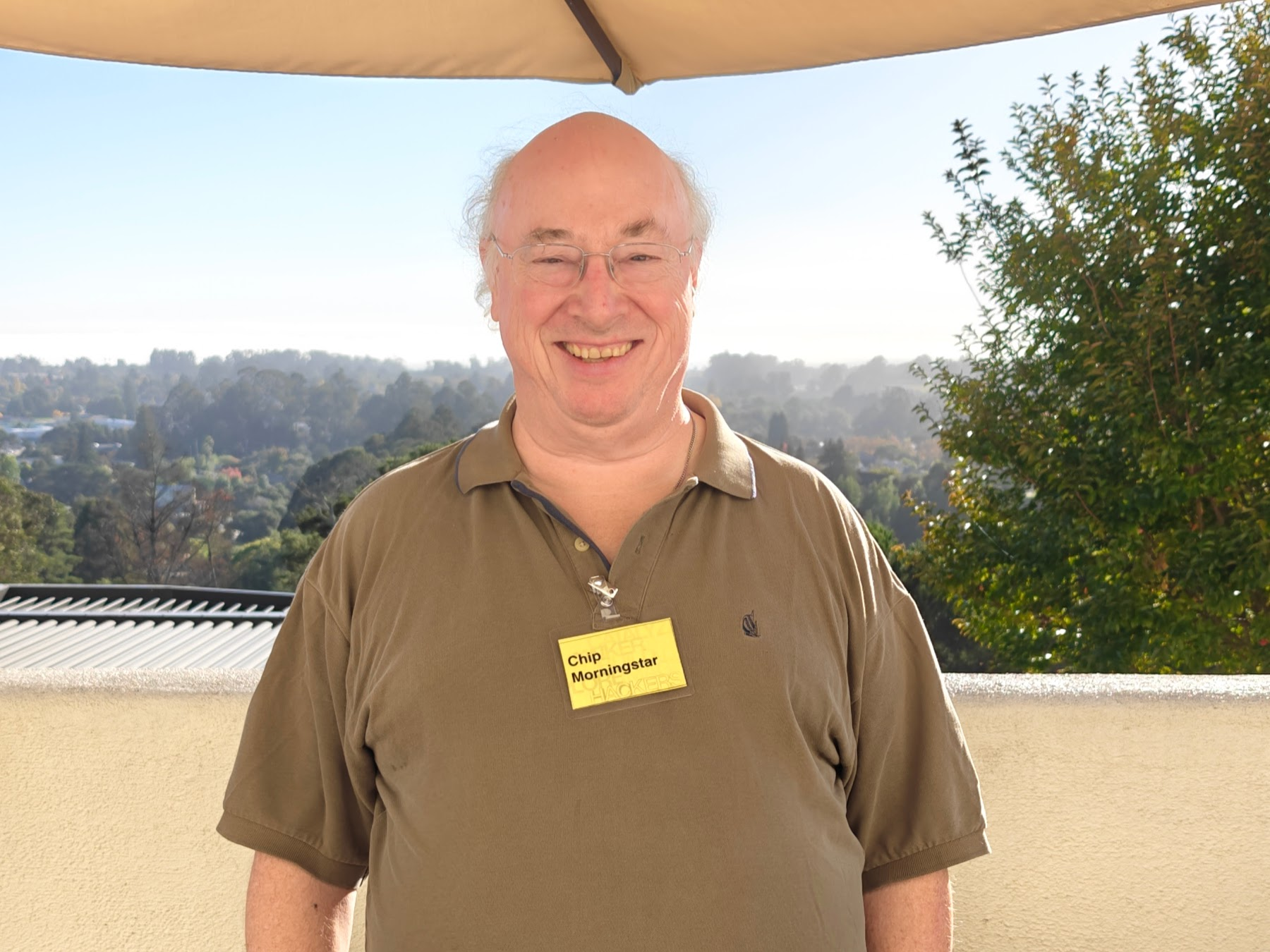
- Born: United States
- Education: University of Michigan
- Occupations: Author, academic, developer of software systems
- Engineering career
- Employers: Agoric; PayPal; Yahoo! Autodesk; Lucasfilm
- Projects: Habitat, American Information Exchange
- Significant design: JSON, E (programming language)
- Awards: First Penguin Award
- Website: www.fudco.com/chip/

Chip Morningstar is an American software architect, mainly for online entertainment and communication.

Morningstar held many jobs throughout his career in the research and development of technology and programs. Most notably was Morningstar's role as project leader for Lucasfilm's Habitat, the first large-scale virtual multiuser environment. In March 2001, Morningstar and colleague Randy Farmer were awarded the inaugural "First Penguin Award" by the International Game Developers Association for their work on Habitat. He also participated in Project Xanadu, for which the word hypertext was coined. Additionally, he is credited with coining the term avatar and pre-Internet work in online information marketplaces.

== Early life and education ==
Morningstar graduated from University of Michigan with a Bachelor of Science degree in Computer Engineering in 1981. While at the University of Michigan he performed research in the Space Physics Research Laboratory, where he wrote device drivers and CAD software for electronic circuitry.

Chip Morningstar started his career as a research assistant at the University of Michigan and as an independent computer consultant. His original major was Aerospace at the University of Michigan. After his summer job in 1977 where he was surrounded by up to date computer technology, he changed his major to computer engineering. In 1979, he took a job at the Environmental Research Institute of Michigan (ERIM) as a research engineer. While at ERIM he developed image processing software, languages and tools for the Cytocomputer. Morningstar also co-invented the Leonard-Morningstar image filter algorithm.

== Career ==
Morningstar worked with Mark S. Miller on Project Xanadu, the first distributed hypertext system (founded in 1960). Later, from 1984 to 1992, he worked at Lucasfilm, Ltd. as a designer and programmer, as well as cyberspace consultant. While at Lucasfilm, Morningstar held the position of Project Leader for Habitat, an early graphical online multiplayer environment, released in 1986. Morningstar oversaw all development staff, as well as writing substantial portions of the server system himself. Use of the term "avatar" for a human being's representative in a game world originated in Habitat, the term referring to a deity's Earthly incarnation in Hindu belief. Morningstar also worked on the SCUMM game engine, used in Maniac Mansion (1987) and Zak McKracken and the Alien Mindbenders (1988).

Presenting at the Second International Conference on Cyberspace in 1991, Morningstar and Randy Farmer found themselves bemused by the seemingly impenetrable postmodern "lit crit" of some academic speakers. They revised their paper, "Cyberspace Colonies", to feature a parody of this phraseology, and presented it on the second day of the conference. Morningstar subsequently published an essay on the topic, "How to Deconstruct Almost Anything". After the conference, he analyzed the leading names in postmodern literary theory and philosophy of the era to determine if there was anything of value hidden behind the dense verbiage, if the underlying concepts were "bogus", or if there was actually no intellectual content at all. Morningstar ultimately determined "there is indeed some content, much of it interesting", but he also wrote: "The language and idea space of the field have become so convoluted that they have confused even themselves." "My Postmodern Adventure" has been described as "a wonderful cutting-through of academic weed to find the ideas that flower at the center of post-modernism".

Morningstar was chief architect at American Information Exchange Corporation, and worked at Electric Communities (with Randy Farmer and Douglas Crockford), which acquired The Palace, the world's largest graphical chat system at the time. They also developed the E programming language.

Morningstar then worked at State Software, where he helped create the JSON format with Crockford in 2001. From 2003 to 2005, he worked at Avistar Communications as principal architect for a videoconferencing system. In 2005, he joined Yahoo!, where he was the principal architect and development team leader for the Yahoo! Core Identity Platform (CoreID). CoreID is a system that provides a framework for the storage and retrieval for all users of Yahoo!. He was also a team leader of the Yahoo! Reputation Platform, as well as a member of Yahoo!'s Social Media advisory program.

After Yahoo!, Morningstar and Farmer ran a consulting firm from 2009 to 2011. From 2012 to 2016, he worked as an architect at PayPal and served as the company's representative to the Ecma TC39 committee, the international JavaScript standards body. In January 2020, he joined Agoric.

== Honors and recognitions ==
In March 2001, Morningstar and his colleague Randy Farmer were awarded the First Penguin Award by the International Game Developers Association for their work on Lucasfilm's Habitat. This game contributed to the evolution of what is now known as massively multiplayer games.
