= Randy Farmer =

American video game designer

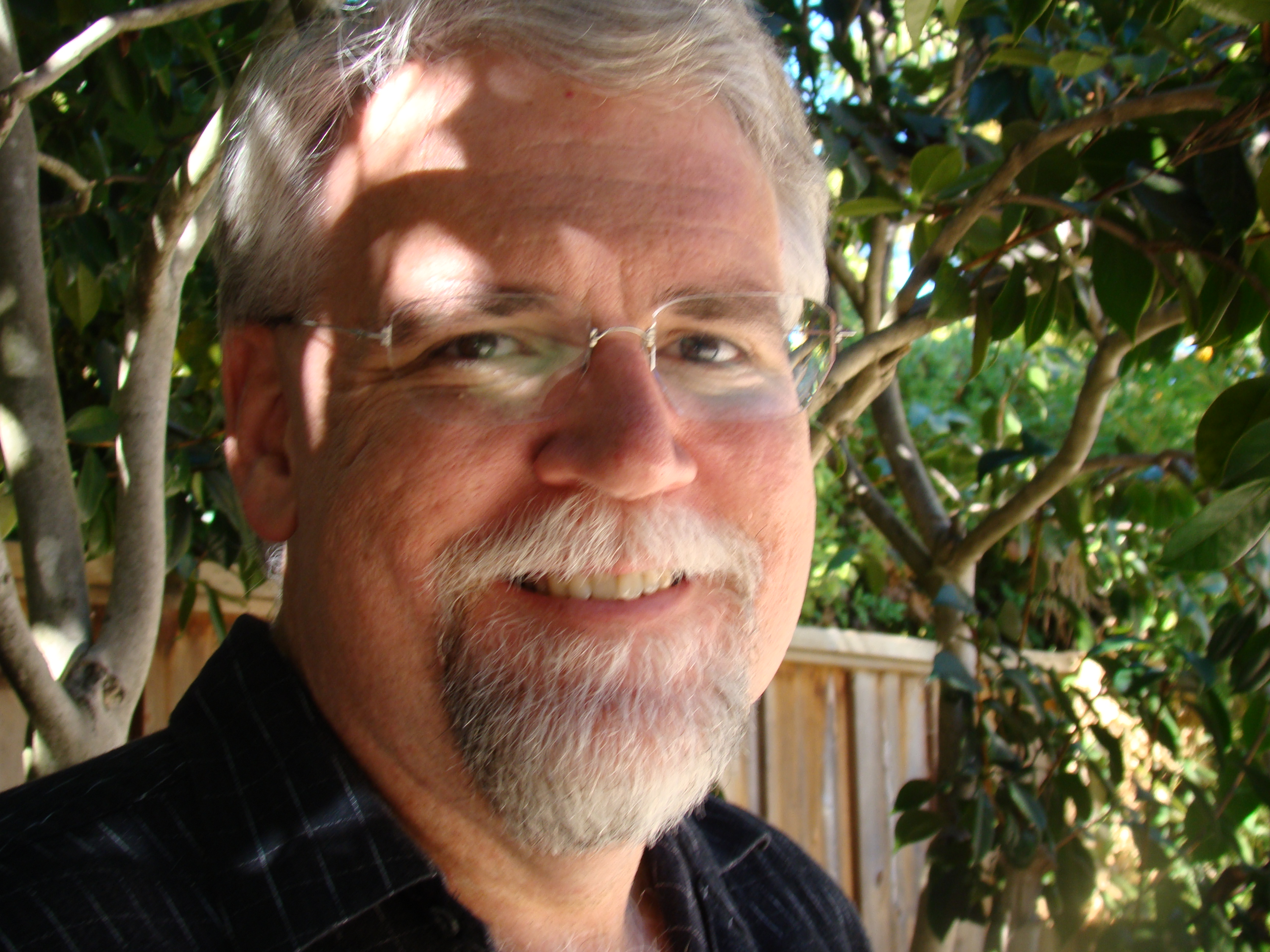
- Randy Farmer, 2008
- Born: Frank Randall Farmer; October 16, 1961 (age 64); New Jersey
- Occupations: Social Software Innovator, Author, CEO
- Known for: Habitat, Yahoo! 360°, Social Media Consultant
- Spouse: Pamela Farmer
- Website: http://habitatchronicles.com/

Frank Randall "Randy" Farmer (born October 16, 1961) is an American game developer, co-creator with Chip Morningstar of one of the first graphical online games, 1985's Habitat. In 2001 he and Morningstar were the first recipients of the Pioneer Award (at the time called the "First Penguin Award") by the International Game Developers Association. Farmer was involved with the creation of Yahoo! 360 and Communities.com, and has published several works on web and game development, social media, and online communities.

== Biography ==
Farmer was born in New Jersey to Frank and Katherine Farmer, and grew up in Michigan. His interest in computers began as a teenager in 1974, as his Junior High School had access to a teletype. He played an early Star Trek game, Mike Mayfield's STTR1, and learned that he could add modifications to it. He began writing his own games at Henry Ford II High School in 1976, and then COMUNI, an early Bulletin board system.

In 1984, Farmer began working at Lucasfilm Games on an Apple II version of Koronis Rift. It was at Lucasfilm that he met Chip Morningstar, who was beginning design on the Habitat project, a groundbreaking graphical multiplayer adventure game. When the project received funding, Morningstar hired Farmer for the team, along with others such as Aric Wilmunder, Janet Hunter, Noah Falstein and Ron Gilbert.

After Lucasfilm, Farmer worked at the American Information Exchange on smart contracts, and founded Communities.com, where he remained from 1993–2001. In 2003 he served as Community Strategy Analyst for Yahoo!, co-designing Yahoo! 360°. From 2009–2011 he was involved with Social Media Strategy Consulting for Answers.com, and in 2011 he founded his own company, Suddenly Social, to provide platform services for social and mobile games. In 2013 he began co-hosting the Social Media Clarity Podcast with Scott Moore and Marc Smith. He was a social media consultant for Rosenfeld Media for 2014–2018.

Farmer was announced as the executive director of the Spritely Institute in 2022. The Institute describes itself as "a 501(c)(3) nonprofit public benefit corporation attempting to re-decentralize community on the internet."

== Awards ==
In March 2001, Farmer and Morningstar were awarded the inaugural "First Penguin Award" (later renamed to Pioneer Award) by the International Game Developers Association for their work on Habitat. In 1995, they were named as Tomorrow Makers by NetGuide magazine.

== Selected works ==
Articles

- Farmer, Randall (Fall 1988). "Habitat Anecdotes". Electric Communities.
- Farmer, Randall; Morningstar, Chip (1990). "The Lessons of Lucasfilm's Habitat", presented at the First International Conference on Cyberspace (UT Austin, May 1990). Published in Cyberspace: First Steps, Michael Benedikt (ed.), MIT Press 1991. ISBN 0-262-02327-X.
- Farmer, Randall (2014). "White Paper: 5 Questions for Selecting an Online Community Platform - Cultivating Community". Cultivate.ning.com.

Blogs

- Habitat Chronicles, the blog of Randy Farmer and Chip Morningstar.
- Building Reputation blog and wiki

Book chapters

- Farmer, Randall (2012). "Web Reputations and the Real World". In Hassan Masum & Mark Tovey (ed.). The Reputation Society: How Online Opinions Are Reshaping the Offline World. The MIT Press. ISBN 978-0-262-01664-3.
- Farmer, Randall (2006). "I Wish I Knew (contributor)". In Brian Green, S. Gregory Boyd (ed.). Business & Legal Primer for Game Development. Charles River Media. ISBN 978-1584504924.
- Farmer, Randall; Morningstar, Chip (2001). "Habitat: Reports from an Online Community". In Vernor Vinge James Frenkel (ed.). True Names: And the Opening of the Cyberspace Frontier. Tor Books. ISBN 978-0312862077.

Books

- Farmer, Randall; Glass, Bryce (2010). Building Web Reputation Systems. O'Reilly. ISBN 978-0596159795.
