= CHIPS (satellite) =

NASA satellite of the Explorer program (2003-2008)

Cosmic Hot Interstellar Plasma Spectrometer
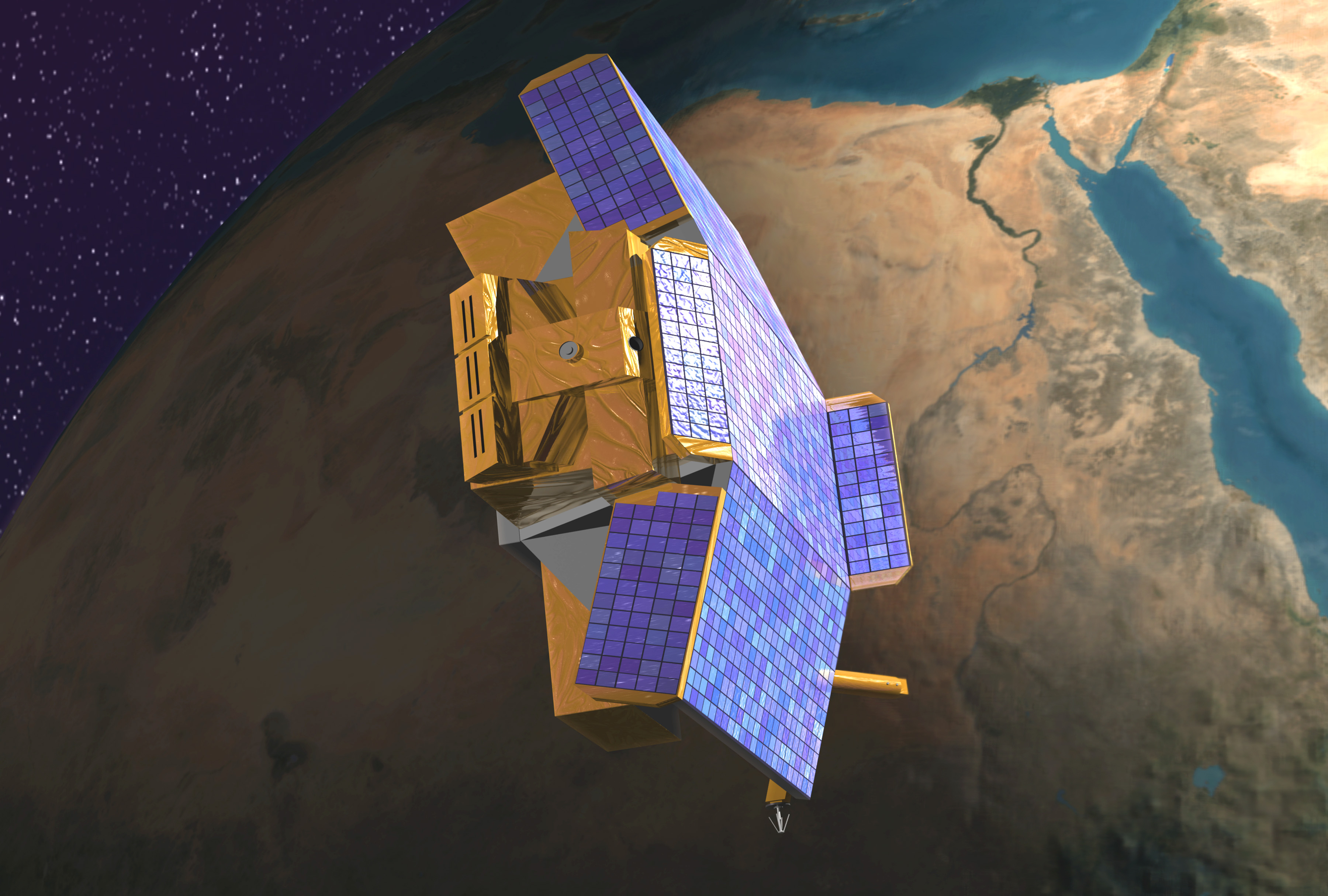
- CHIPS (Explorer 82) satellite
- Names: Explorer 82; UNEX-2; CHIPS
- Mission type: Extreme ultraviolet research
- Operator: NASA / Space Sciences Laboratory
- COSPAR ID: 2003-002B
- SATCAT no.: 27643
- Website: CHIPS
- Mission duration: 1 year (planned); 5 years, 3 months (achieved)

Spacecraft properties
- Spacecraft: Explorer LXXXII
- Spacecraft type: Cosmic Hot Interstellar Plasma Spectrometer
- Bus: CHIPS
- Manufacturer: SpaceDev
- Launch mass: 60 kg (130 lb)
- Dimensions: 5 × 2.8 × 3.2 m (16.4 × 9.2 × 10.5 ft)

Start of mission
- Launch date: 13 January 2003, 00:45:00 UTC
- Rocket: Delta II 7320-10 (Delta 294)
- Launch site: Vandenberg, SLC-2W
- Contractor: Boeing Launch Services
- Entered service: 2003

End of mission
- Deactivated: 11 April 2008

Orbital parameters
- Reference system: Geocentric orbit
- Regime: Low Earth orbit
- Perigee altitude: 578 km (359 mi)
- Apogee altitude: 594 km (369 mi)
- Inclination: 94.05°
- Period: 96.40 minutes

CHIPS (Cosmic Hot Interstellar Plasma Spectrometer, also Explorer 82 or UNEX-2, sometimes CHIPSAT) was a NASA Explorer program satellite. It was launched on 12 January 2003 from Vandenberg Air Force Base aboard a Delta II with the larger satellite ICESat, and had an intended mission duration of one year. CHIPS was the second of NASA's University Explorer (UNEX) mission class. It performed spectroscopy from 90 to 250 Angstrom (9 to 26-nm) extreme ultraviolet (EUV) light.

== Mission ==
The primary objective of the science team, led by principal investigator Mark Hurwitz, was to study the million-degree gas in the local interstellar medium. CHIPS was designed to capture the first spectra of the faint, extreme ultraviolet glow that is expected to be emitted by the hot interstellar gas within about 300 light-years of the Sun, a region often referred to as the Local Bubble. Surprisingly, these measurements produced a null result, with only very faint EUV emissions detected, despite theoretical expectations of much stronger emissions. It was the first U.S. mission to use TCP/IP for end-to-end satellite operations control.

== Spacecraft ==
The University of California, Berkeley's Space Sciences Laboratory (SSL) served as CHIP's primary ground station and manufactured the CHIPS spectrograph, designed to perform all-sky spectroscopy. Other ground network support was provided by ground stations at Wallops Flight Facility (WFF), Virginia and Adelaide, Australia. CHIPS's satellite bus was manufactured by SpaceDev.

== Launch ==
CHIPS (Cosmic Hot Interstellar Plasma Spectrometer) is a NASA astrophysics spacecraft that was launched by a Delta II launch vehicle from Vandenberg Air Force Base at 00:45:00 UTC on 13 January 2003. The 60 kg (130 lb), triaxially-stabilized spacecraft has a spectrograph covering the 9–26 nm wavelength band at a resolution of 0.1 nm, scanning the entire sky in chunks of 5° x 27° segments during each orbit. The targets are the hot and diffuse nebula at about a million degrees temperature. The band covers several strong emission lines.

== Solar observatory ==
In September 2005, the spacecraft was converted to a solar observatory. From 3 April 2006 to 5 April 2008, CHIPS performed 1458 observations of the Sun.

== End of mission ==
Satellite operations were terminated on 11 April 2008 due to budget constraints.

== See also ==
- Explorer program
- Extreme ultraviolet
