= James C. Bennett =

American businessman

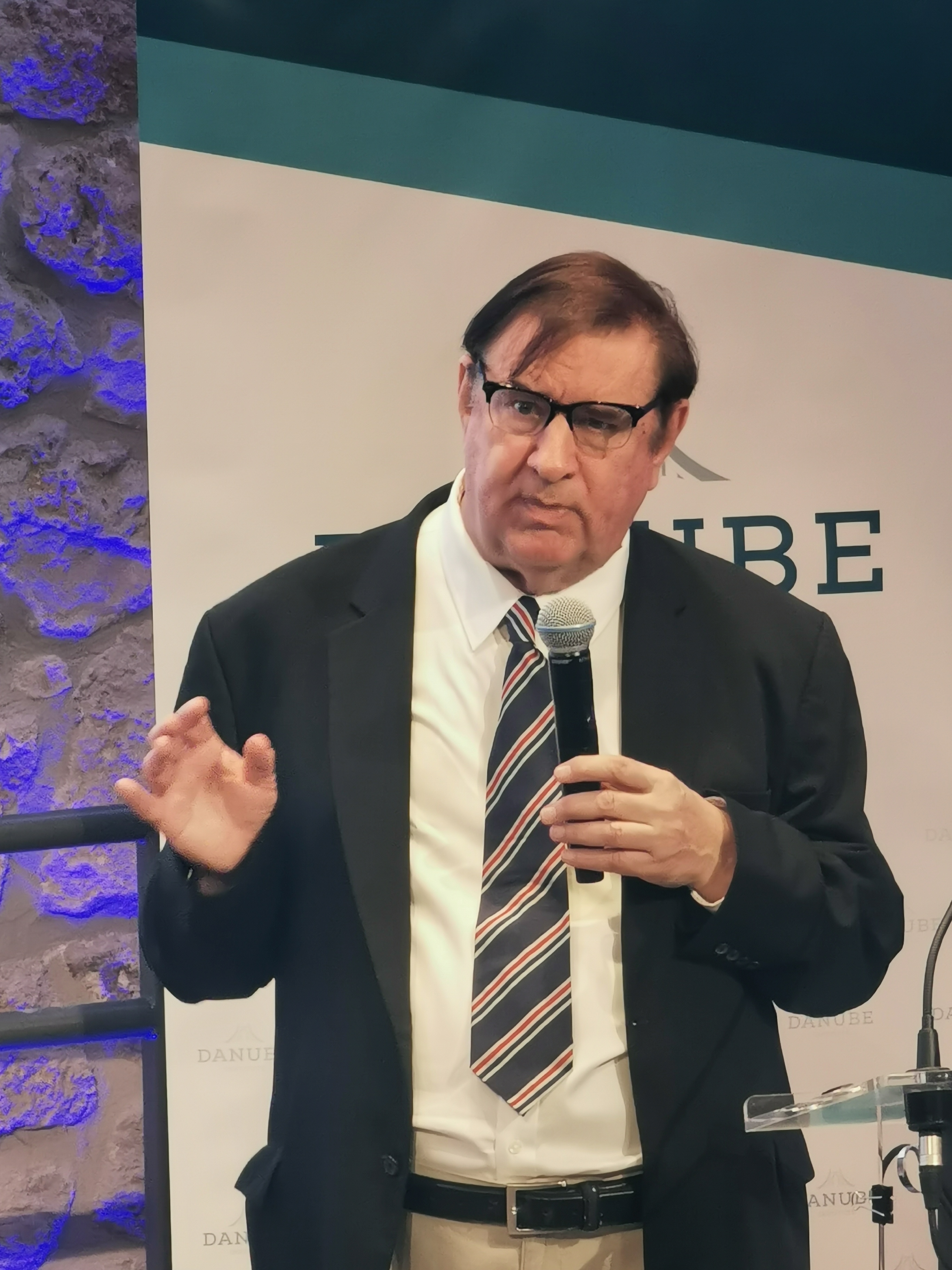
Bennett in 2024

James (Jim) Charles Bennett (born 1948) is an American businessman, with a background in technology companies and consultancy, and a writer on technology and international affairs from a conservative point of view.

During the 1980s he was involved in space-launch ventures, being a founder of Starstruck Inc. and of American Rocket Company (AMROC) in 1985; technology of these companies found its way into SpaceShipOne. In the 1990s he was a technology consultant. He is president and chairman of Internet Transactions Transnational, Inc., a 1997 Internet start-up, and vice chairman of Openworld, Inc., a nonprofit group promoting sustainable self-help initiatives. As of 2011, he is a proponent of fundamental reform of the U.S. government space program, both in its civilian and military manifestations.

His publications and quotes like "democracy, immigration, multiculturalism… pick any two", popularising the idea of Anglospheric exceptionalism in a similar vein as Mark Steyn, have been called misleading by some libertarian writers. He was a columnist for United Press International.

He is also an Adjunct Senior Fellow of the Hudson Institute, and a contributor to its publications. In addition, Mr. Bennett serves as an Expert at Wikistrat.

Jim Bennett is one of the directors of the Institute for Molecular Manufacturing (IMM), affiliated with the Foresight Institute.
