= SpaceDev =

Company

Sierra Nevada Corporation's Space Systems (formerly SpaceDev, Inc.)
- Type: Subsidiary
- Industry: Aerospace & Defense
- Founded: Poway, California (1997)
- Headquarters: Poway, California
- Key people: Mark N. Sirangelo, CEO (Principal Executive Officer) and Chairman of the Board of Directors. Richard B. Slansky, President and CFO. (Principal Financial and Accounting Officer). Scott Tibbitts, Managing Director and Director. James S. Voss, Vice President.
- Products: Small Spacecraft, Propulsion Products and Services, Space Components and Mechanisms, Structures
- Revenue: USD $33 million (2006)
- Number of employees: 208
- Website: spacedev.com (archived)

SpaceDev, a part of the "Space Systems Business" of Sierra Nevada Corporation, is prominent for its spaceflight and microsatellite work. It designed and built components for the hybrid rocket motors for Paul Allen's Tier One suborbital SpaceShipOne space program operated by Scaled Composites. It is also developing micro- and nano-satellites, a small expendable launch vehicle, the SpaceDev Streaker, and has designed a piloted suborbital and orbital spaceship of its own, the SpaceDev Dream Chaser, in collaboration with NASA.

SpaceDev is based near San Diego in Poway, California. Its objective is to make routine commercial spaceflight possible and to help open space for all of humanity.

Previously a publicly traded company (OTCBB:SPDV), on 20 October 2008 SpaceDev officials announced that the company would be acquired by Sierra Nevada Corporation, a privately owned company. The announced acquisition price was 38 million dollars. The role of SpaceDev will be melded into another of Sierra Nevada's subsidiary companies, MicroSat, to create a more complete space technology unit. On December 16, 2008, SpaceDev announced its acquisition by Sierra Nevada Corporation had been completed.

== History ==
SpaceDev was founded in 1997 by Jim Benson, who acquired Integrated Space Systems of Southern California and then acquired a dormant publicly traded Colorado corporation through a reverse acquisition to create the publicly traded SpaceDev. For a while, SpaceDev also owned UK-based Space Innovations Limited. In August 1998 SpaceDev acquired all patents, intellectual property, test results, and documents that had been produced by the out of business American Rocket Company (AMROC).

On August 6, 1998, the United States Securities and Exchange Commission filed an administrative proceeding alleging securities fraud against Spacedev Inc. According to the SEC, Spacedev promotes itself extensively on the Internet. The SEC alleged that the company made false and misleading statements over the Internet and via other media in violation of U.S. securities laws in an attempt to increase its stock value. The SEC was seeking cease and desist orders against Spacedev and its chairman, James W. Benson. A settlement was reached between the SEC, Spacedev and James W. Benson. The settlement states that the SEC was founded in its allegations and SpaceDev cease and desist from committing or causing violations or future violations of Section 17(a) of the Securities Act and Section 10(b) of the Exchange Act and Rule 10b-5 thereunder; and Mr. Benson cease and desist from committing or causing violations or future violations of Section 17(a) of the Securities Act and Section 10(b) of the Exchange Act and Rule 10b-5 thereunder.

The company's first big project was to be the Near Earth Asteroid Prospector, or NEAP, a small innovative commercial spacecraft mission that would have rendezvoused with and landed on a Near Earth Asteroid (NEO), conducted scientific experiments, and claimed the asteroid as private property. As it turned out however, the company's first success would come a little closer to home, in the form of CHIPSat , the Cosmic Hot Interstellar Plasma Spectrometer microsatellite. SpaceDev built and conducted early orbit operations of the Low Earth Orbit (LEO) microsat, the first to use only the Internet for its communications, for University of California at Berkeley under NASA's University Explorer Program (UNEX). This was followed one year later by supplying the rocket motors that propelled SpaceShipOne into the history books by creating the world's first civilian astronauts and helping Paul Allen win the $10 million Ansari X Prize.

On October 26, 2005, SpaceDev announced that the Starsys Research Corporation of Boulder, Colorado, would merge with SpaceDev, which would provide SpaceDev with additional expertise and experience with microsatellite technologies. The acquisition of Starsys on January 31, 2006, put the number of SpaceDev employees over 200, located in three states. The Starsys division is being groomed to become a center of space robotics for SpaceDev. Over 18 years Starsys developed and delivered 2,000 space mechanisms that have flown on over 200 missions, all successfully. SpaceDev has most or all of the moving parts on Mars at this time, had mechanisms on Deep Impact, is supplying the separation system and docking mechanism for the soon to be launched Orbital Express, and has mechanisms on the way to Pluto.

On September 28, 2006, SpaceDev announced that founder and CEO Jim Benson was stepping down to start a new space tourism venture, The Benson Space Company (BSC). BSC was expected to be one of SpaceDev's largest customers, purchasing multiple Dream Chaser spaceships for use in personal spaceflight. However BSC was dissolved following the death of Jim Benson on October 10, 2008, due to a brain tumor.

== Dream Chaser ==
On November 16, 2005, SpaceDev announced its Dream Chaser concept for a four-passenger sub-orbital and a six-passenger orbital vehicle, both based on NASA's HL-20 "Personnel Launch System" or "Space Taxi". SpaceDev's suborbital Dream Chaser will use internal hybrid rocket motors similar to those SpaceDev developed for Paul Allen's SpaceShipOne, while the orbital version will use the internal motors plus larger external hybrid motors. SpaceDev's hybrid rocket technology was pioneered by the American Rocket Company.

On May 5, 2006, SpaceDev announced it was selected as a finalist in NASA's $500 million Commercial Orbital Transportation Services (COTS) demonstration program. SpaceDev has been working with NASA Ames to design a modern version of the NASA HL-20 Personnel Launch System, called the SpaceDev Dream Chaser. However, on August 18, 2006, it was revealed that SpaceDev did not win the contract.

On December 18, 2006, SpaceDev announced that it has been awarded a $330,000 Phase I study contract from Benson Space Company to further the SpaceDev Dream Chaser spaceship program. The study will contribute to the ongoing development of the spaceship and will result in space vehicle and rocket motor designs ready for Phase II vehicle fabrication and testing. The SpaceDev Dream Chaser spaceship is based on NASA's design of the ten passenger orbital HL-20 Personnel Launch System, and will launch vertically and land horizontally in direct sight of viewers.

On April 10, 2007, SpaceDev announced that it had finalized a Memorandum of Understanding with United Launch Alliance on exploring the potential of launching the SpaceDev Dream Chaser spaceship using an Atlas V 431, (having a four-meter diameter fairing, three solid rocket boosters, and a single Centaur engine in the second stage). Destinations could include the International Space Station (ISS) and other commercial orbital destinations as well as for commercial orbital space tourism flights.

On February 1, 2010, NASA announced a $20 million award to Sierra Nevada, to go toward development of the SpaceDev Dream Chaser, which could be ready for launch by 2014 on United Launch Alliance's Atlas V rocket, according to Mark Sirangelo, corporate vice president for Sierra Nevada's space systems division.

On August 3, 2012, NASA announced new agreements with the Sierra Nevada Corporation and two other companies to design and develop the next generation of U.S. human spaceflight capabilities, enabling a launch of astronauts from U.S. soil in the next five years. Advances made by these companies under newly signed Space Act Agreements through the agency's Commercial Crew Integrated Capability (CCiCap) initiative are intended to ultimately lead to the availability of commercial human spaceflight services for government and commercial customers. As part of this agreement, Sierra Nevada Corporation was awarded $212.5 million, ostensibly to continue development and testing of its Dream Chaser spacecraft.

== Trailblazer ==
SpaceDev manufactured the Trailblazer satellite selected by the Operationally Responsive Space Office for its Jumpstart mission. Trailblazer was a microsatellite developed under a Missile Defense Agency contract. After being launched Trailblazer would have collected image data and communicated with a ground station.

Trailblazer was the primary payload for the third attempted flight of a Falcon 1 launch vehicle. The launch was attempted on August 3, 2008, and ended in failure, with loss of both vehicle and payload.

TrailBlazer was researched, designed, assembled, tested and packed for shipping almost entirely at the Poway SpaceDev location. With a team of about 25 employees, the satellite was assembled and ready for launch in 4 months, thus meeting their advanced deadline and winning their opportunity for launch.

== Streaker ==
The Streaker was a family of rockets conceptualized by SpaceDev with the goal of a low-cost, low complexity launch vehicle. Planned to first launch in 2007-8, it has more likely than not been abandoned by the company as little to no information is available.
