= American Information Exchange =

- Industry: Software
- Founded: 1984; 42 years ago
- Founder: Phil Salin
- Defunct: 1992
- Headquarters: Palo Alto, California,, U.S.
- Key people: Chip Morningstar; Randy Farmer
- Parent: Autodesk

The American Information Exchange (AMIX) was a platform for the buying and selling of information, goods and services as well as the exchange of information, ideas, and certain kinds of intellectual work product, created by economist and futurist Phil Salin in the 1980s, together with Chip Morningstar (chief architect) and Randy Farmer, and involvement from Esther Dyson and Mitch Kapor. Economist Bill Tulloh was market manager.

Salin began thinking about information marketplaces in the 1970s, and was inspired by Friedrich Hayek's idea of spontaneous order. Starting in 1984, Salin worked on AMIX as a tool with the goal of elevating individual decision making over central planning, and improving human coordination to help reduce transaction costs in the economy. AMIX would be an international network for the exchange of information, consulting contracts, computer code and research. He envisaged a world in which the ready exchange of expertise would reduce transaction costs, with wide-ranging beneficial effects. In particular, he predicted that information markets would reduce the need for redundant employees at different organizations, so that companies would become smaller and more efficient, relying on each other as external sources of expertise. He also expected revolutionary political changes as the markets became widely adopted.

The AMIX platform was accessed via dial-up and client PC software written in C. The project originated long before the widespread deployment of the Internet, so the challenge of creating the market was compounded by the technical difficulty of creating the network on which it would run. AMIX developed the early mechanics of reputation systems, payment processing, online dispute resolution, as well smart contracts.

AMIX had markets for information in primarily technical or business-related fields: on products, technologies, companies and industries, market research reports, and software (including shareware). Services offered included consulting, editing, writing, and information brokering. Each product offered was priced between $1 and $500, and consulting engagements could be made for amounts up to $2000. AMIX would take a 30% intermediation fee, but did not prohibit private sales.

AMIX shared office space with Xanadu, both part of Autodesk. Autodesk acquired 80% of the company in 1988 and funded it until shortly after Phil Salin died in December 1991. Among early adopters, the computer industry itself became the source of many early markets such as a network for the exchange of libraries of object-oriented computer code. AMIX left Autodesk and cut staff in August/September 1992 and later closed its doors.
