= Hybrid-propellant rocket =

Rocket engine that uses both liquid / gaseous and solid fuel

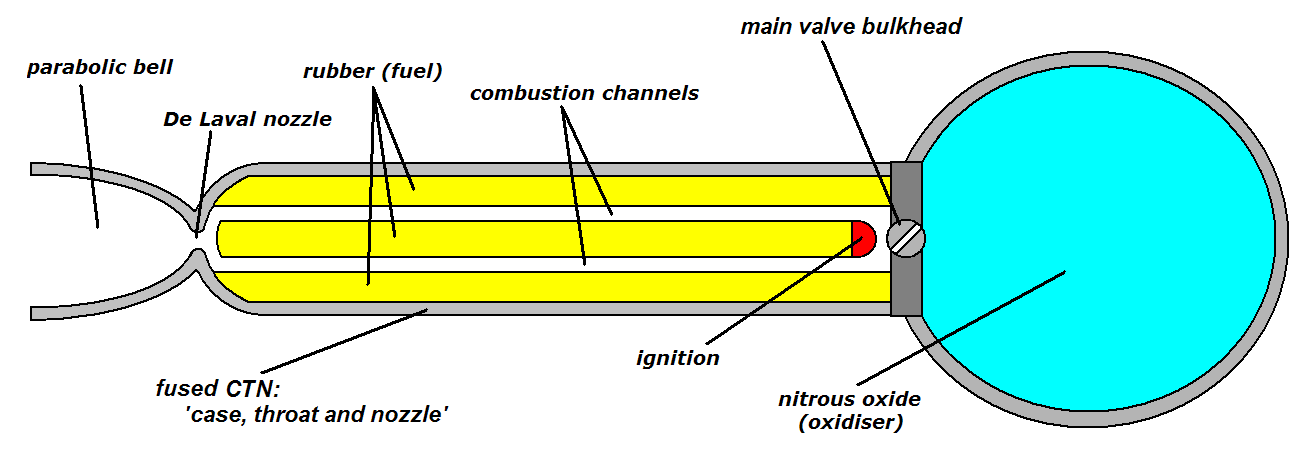
Hybrid rocket motor detail of SpaceShipOne

A hybrid-propellant rocket is a rocket with a rocket motor that uses rocket propellants in two different phases: one solid and the other either gas or liquid. The hybrid rocket concept can be traced back to the early 1930s.

Hybrid rockets avoid some of the disadvantages of solid rockets like the dangers of propellant handling, while also avoiding some disadvantages of liquid rockets like their mechanical complexity. Because it is difficult for the fuel and oxidizer to be mixed intimately (being different states of matter), hybrid rockets tend to fail more benignly than liquids or solids. Like liquid rocket engines, hybrid rocket motors can be shut down easily and the thrust is throttleable. The theoretical specific impulse ($I_{sp}$) performance of hybrids is generally higher than solid motors and lower than liquid engines. $I_{sp}$ as high as 400 s has been measured in a hybrid rocket using metalized fuels. Hybrid systems are more complex than solid ones, but they avoid significant hazards of manufacturing, shipping and handling solid rocket motors by storing the oxidizer and the fuel separately.

== History ==
The first work on hybrid rockets was performed in the early 1930s at the Soviet Group for the Study of Reactive Motion. Mikhail Klavdievich Tikhonravov was responsible for the first hybrid propelled rocket launch, the GIRD-9, on 17 August 1933, which reached an altitude of 400 metres (1,300 ft). He would later supervise the design of Sputnik I and the Luna programme. In the late 1930s, there was concurrent work done in Germany at IG Farben and in the United States at the California Rocket Society. Leonid Andrussow, working in Germany, theorized hybrid propellant rockets. O. Lutz, W. Noeggerath, and Andrussow tested a 10-kilonewton (2,200 lbf) hybrid rocket motor using coal and gaseous N_{2}O as the propellants. Oberth also worked on a hybrid rocket motor using LOX as the oxidizer and graphite as the fuel. The high heat of sublimation of carbon prevented these rocket motors from operating efficiently, as it resulted in a negligible burning rate. In 1938, the California Rocket Society experimented with a coal and gaseous oxygen hybrid rocket.

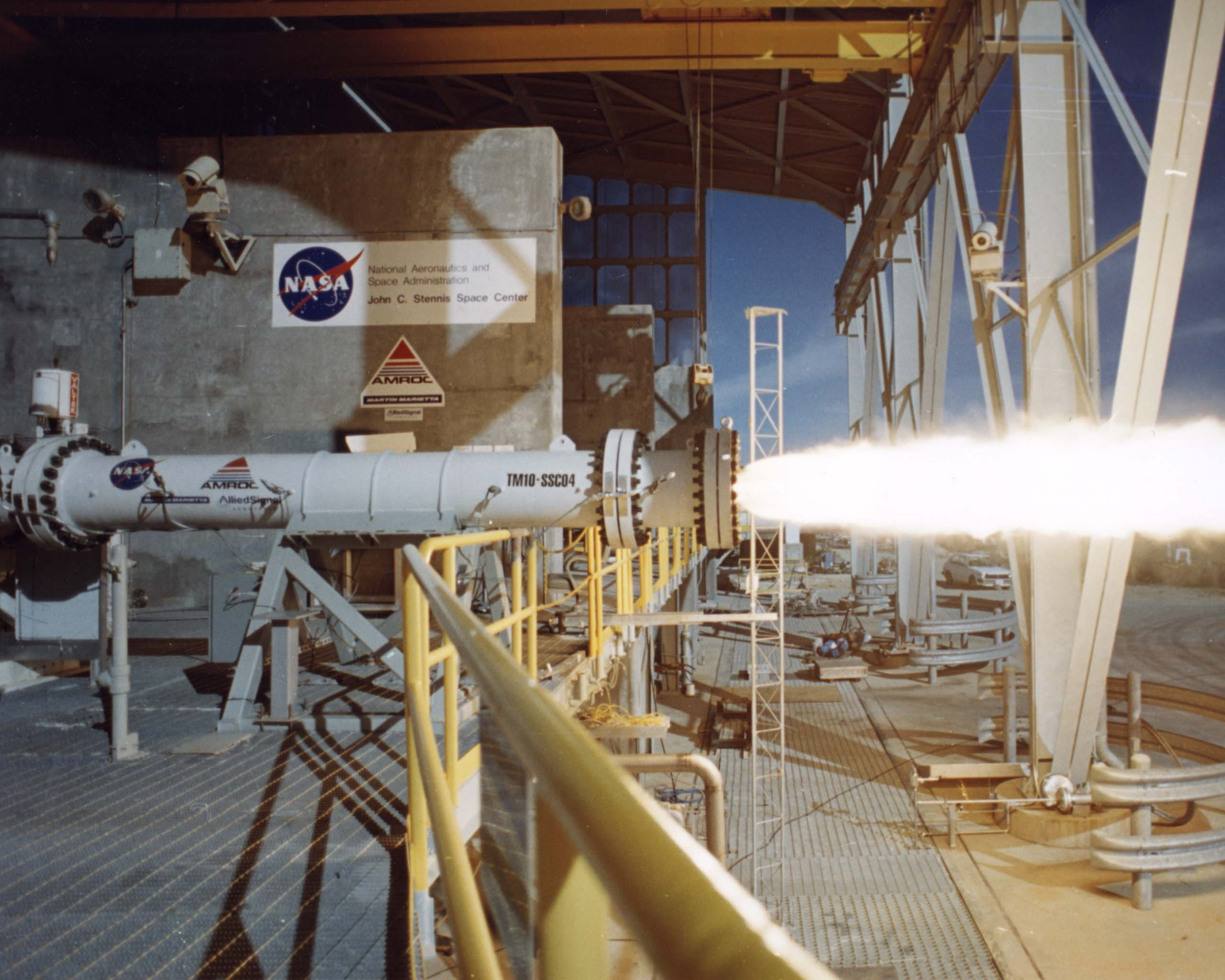
AMROC test of 10,000 pounds-force (44 kN) thrust hybrid rocket motor in 1994 at Stennis Space Center.

In the 1940s, the California Pacific Rocket Society used LOX in combination with several different fuel types, including wood, wax, and rubber. The most successful of these tests was with the rubber fuel, which is still the dominant fuel in use today. In June 1951, a LOX / rubber rocket was flown to an altitude of 9 kilometres (5.6 mi).

Two major efforts occurred in the 1950s. One of these efforts was by G. Moore and K. Berman at General Electric. The duo used 90% high test peroxide (HTP, or H_{2}O_{2}) and polyethylene (PE) in a rod and tube grain design. They drew several significant conclusions from their work. The fuel grain had uniform burning. Grain cracks did not affect combustion, like it does with solid rocket motors. No hard starts were observed (a hard start is a pressure spike seen close to the time of ignition, typical of liquid rocket engines). The fuel surface acted as a flame holder, which encouraged stable combustion. The oxidizer could be throttled with one valve, and a high oxidizer to fuel ratio helped simplify combustion. The negative observations were low burning rates and that the thermal instability of peroxide was problematic for safety reasons. Another effort that occurred in the 1950s was the development of a reverse hybrid. In a standard hybrid rocket motor, the solid material is the fuel. In a reverse hybrid rocket motor, the oxidizer is solid. William Avery of the Applied Physics Laboratory used jet fuel and ammonium nitrate, selected for their low cost. His O/F ratio was 0.035, which was 200 times smaller than the ratio used by Moore and Berman.

In 1953 Pacific Rocket Society (est. 1943) was developing the XDF-23, a 10-by-183-centimetre (4 in × 72 in) hybrid rocket, designed by Jim Nuding, using LOX and rubber polymer called "Thiokol". They had already tried other fuels in prior iterations including cotton, paraffin wax and wood. The XDF name itself comes from "experimental Douglas fir" from one of the first units.

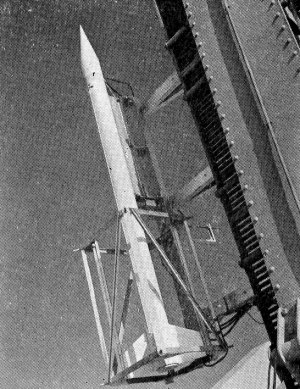
LEX French sounding rocket

In the 1960s, European organizations also began work on hybrid rockets. ONERA, based in France, and Volvo Flygmotor, based in Sweden, developed sounding rockets using hybrid rocket motor technology. The ONERA group focused on a hypergolic rocket motor, using nitric acid and an amine fuel, developing the LEX sounding rocket. The company flew eight rockets: Once in April 1964, three times in June 1965, and four times in 1967. The maximum altitude the flights achieved was over 100 kilometres (62 mi). The Volvo Flygmotor group also used a hypergolic propellant combination. They also used nitric acid for their oxidizer, but used Tagaform (polybutadiene with an aromatic amine) as their fuel. Their flight was in 1969, lofting a 20-kilogram (44 lb) payload to 80 kilometres (50 mi).

Meanwhile, in the United States, United Technologies Center (Chemical Systems Division) and Beech Aircraft were working on a supersonic target drone, known as Sandpiper. It used MON-25 (mixed 25% NO, 75% N_{2}O_{4}) as the oxidizer and polymethyl methacrylate (PMM) and Mg for the fuel. The drone flew six times in 1968, for more than 300 seconds and to an altitude greater than 160 kilometres (100 mi). The second iteration of the rocket, known as the HAST, had IRFNA-PB/PMM for its propellants and was throttleable over a 10/1 range. HAST could carry a heavier payload than the Sandpiper. Another iteration, which used the same propellant combination as the HAST, was developed by Chemical Systems Division and Teledyne Aircraft. Development for this program ended in the mid-1980s. Chemical Systems Division also worked on a propellant combination of lithium and FLOx (mixed F_{2} and O_{2}). This was an efficient hypergolic rocket that was throttleable. The vacuum specific impulse was 380 seconds at 93% combustion efficiency.

American Rocket Company (AMROC) developed the largest hybrid rockets ever created in the late 1980s and early 1990s. The first version of their engine, fired at the Air Force Phillips Laboratory, produced 312,000 newtons (70,000 lbf) of thrust for 70 seconds with a propellant combination of LOX and hydroxyl-terminated polybutadiene (HTPB) rubber. The second version of the motor, known as the H-250F, produced more than 1,000,000 newtons (220,000 lbf) of thrust.

Korey Kline of Environmental Aeroscience Corporation (eAc) first fired a gaseous oxygen and rubber hybrid in 1982 at Lucerne Dry Lake, CA, after discussions on the technology with Bill Wood, formerly with Westinghouse. The first SpaceShipOne hybrid tests were successfully conducted by Kline and eAc at Mojave, CA.

In 1994, the U.S. Air Force Academy flew a hybrid sounding rocket to an altitude of 5 kilometres (3.1 mi). The 6.4 metres (21 ft) rocket used HTPB and LOX for its propellant, and reached a peak thrust of 4,400 newtons (990 lbf) and had a thrust duration of 16 seconds.

== Basic concepts ==
Hybrid rocket propulsion system conceptual overview

In its simplest form, a hybrid rocket consists of a pressure vessel (tank) containing the liquid oxidizer, the combustion chamber containing the solid propellant, and a mechanical device separating the two. When thrust is desired, a suitable ignition source is introduced in the combustion chamber and the valve is opened. The liquid oxidiser (or gas) flows into the combustion chamber where it is vaporized and then reacted with the solid propellant. Combustion occurs in a boundary layer diffusion flame adjacent to the surface of the solid propellant.

Generally, the liquid propellant is the oxidizer and the solid propellant is the fuel because solid oxidizers are extremely dangerous and lower performing than liquid oxidizers. Furthermore, using a solid fuel such as Hydroxyl-terminated polybutadiene (HTPB) or paraffin wax allows for the incorporation of high-energy fuel additives such as aluminium, lithium, or metal hydrides.

== Combustion ==
The governing equation for hybrid rocket combustion shows that the regression rate is dependent on the oxidizer mass flux rate, which means the rate that the fuel will burn is proportional to the amount of oxidizer flowing through the port. This differs from a solid rocket motor, in which the regression rate is proportional to the chamber pressure of the motor.

$$\dot{r}=a_oG^n_o$$

where $\dot{r}$ is the regression rate, a_{o} is the regression rate coefficient (incorporating the grain length), G_{o} is the oxidizer mass flux rate, and n is the regression rate exponent.

As the motor burns, the increase in diameter of the fuel port results in an increased fuel mass flow rate. This phenomenon makes the oxidizer to fuel ratio (O/F) shift during the burn. The increased fuel mass flow rate can be compensated for by also increasing the oxidizer mass flow rate. In addition to the O/F varying as a function of time, it also varies based on the position down the fuel grain. The closer the position is to the top of the fuel grain, the higher the O/F ratio. Since the O/F varies down the port, a point called the stoichiometric point may exist at some point down the grain.

== Properties ==
Hybrid rocket motors exhibit some obvious as well as some subtle advantages over liquid-fuel rockets and solid-fuel rockets. A brief summary of some of these is given below:

=== Advantages compared with liquid rockets ===
- Mechanically simpler – requires only a single liquid propellant resulting in less plumbing, fewer valves, and simpler operations.
- Denser fuel – fuels in the solid phase generally have higher density than those in the liquid phase, reducing overall system volume.
- Metal additives – reactive metals such as aluminium, magnesium, lithium or beryllium can be easily included in the fuel grain increasing specific impulse ($I_{sp}$), density, or both.
- Combustion instabilities – Hybrid rockets do not typically exhibit high frequency combustion instabilities that plague liquid rockets due to the solid fuel grain breaking up acoustic waves that would otherwise reflect in an open liquid engine combustion chamber.
- Propellant pressurization – One of the most difficult to design portions of a liquid rocket system are the turbopumps. Turbopump design is complex as it has to precisely and efficiently pump and keep separated two fluids of different properties in precise ratios at very high volumetric flow rates, often cryogenic temperatures, and highly volatile chemicals while combusting those same fluids in order to power itself. Hybrids have far less fluid to move and can often be pressurized by a blow-down system (which would be prohibitively heavy in a liquid rocket) or self-pressurized oxidizers (such as N_{2}O).
- Cooling – Liquid rockets often depend on one of the propellants, typically the fuel, to cool the combustion chamber and nozzle due to the very high heat fluxes and vulnerability of the metal walls to oxidation and stress cracking. Hybrid rockets have combustion chambers that are lined with the solid propellant which shields it from the product gases. Their nozzles are often graphite or coated in ablative materials similarly to solid rocket motors. The design, construction, and testing of liquid cooling flows is complex, making the system more prone to failure.

=== Advantages compared with solid rockets ===
- Higher theoretical $I_{sp}$ – Possible due to limits of known solid oxidizers compared to often used liquid oxidizers.
- Less explosion hazard – Propellant grain is more tolerant of processing errors such as cracks since the burn rate is dependent on oxidizer mass flux rate. Propellant grain cannot be ignited by stray electrical charge and is very insensitive to auto-igniting due to heat. Hybrid rocket motors can be transported to the launch site with the oxidizer and fuel stored separately, improving safety.
- Fewer handling and storage issues – Ingredients in solid rockets are often incompatible chemically and thermally. Repeated changes in temperature can cause distortion of the grain. Antioxidants and coatings are used to keep the grain from breaking down or decomposing.
- More controllable – Stop/restart and throttling are all easily incorporated into most designs. Solid rockets rarely can be shut down easily and almost never have throttling or restart capabilities.

=== Disadvantages of hybrid rockets ===
Hybrid rockets also exhibit some disadvantages when compared with liquid and solid rockets. These include:

- Oxidizer-to-fuel ratio shift ("O/F shift") – with a constant oxidizer flow-rate, the ratio of fuel production rate to oxidizer flow rate will change as a grain regresses. This leads to off-peak operation from a chemical performance point of view. However, for a well-designed hybrid, O/F shift has a very small impact on performance because $I_{sp}$ is insensitive to O/F shift near the peak.
- Poor regression characteristics often drive multi-port fuel grains. Multi-port fuel grains have poor volumetric efficiency and, often, structural deficiencies. High regression rate liquefying fuels developed in the late 1990s offer a potential solution to this problem.
- Compared with liquid-based propulsion, re-fueling a partially or totally depleted hybrid rocket would present significant challenges, as the solid propellant cannot simply be pumped into a fuel tank. This may or may not be an issue, depending upon how the rocket is planned to be used.

In general, much less development work has been completed with hybrids than liquids or solids and it is likely that some of these disadvantages could be rectified through further investment in research and development.

One problem in designing large hybrid orbital rockets is that turbopumps become necessary to achieve high flow rates and pressurization of the oxidizer. This turbopump must be powered by something. In a traditional liquid-propellant rocket, the turbopump uses the same fuel and oxidizer as the rocket, since they are both liquid and can be fed to the pre-burner. But in a hybrid, the fuel is solid and cannot be fed to a turbopump's engine. Some hybrids use an oxidizer that can also be used as a monopropellant, such as hydrogen peroxide, and so a turbopump can run on it alone. However, hydrogen peroxide is significantly less efficient than liquid oxygen, which cannot be used alone to run a turbopump. Another fuel would be needed, requiring its own tank and decreasing rocket performance.

== Fuel ==
=== Common fuel choices ===
A reverse-hybrid rocket, which is not very common, is one where the engine uses a solid oxidizer and a liquid fuel. Some liquid fuel options are kerosene, hydrazine, and LH_{2}. Common fuels for a typical hybrid rocket engine include polymers such as acrylics, polyethylene (PE), cross-linked rubber, such as HTPB, or liquefying fuels such as paraffin wax. Plexiglass was a common fuel, since the combustion could be visible through the transparent combustion chamber. Hydroxyl-terminated polybutadiene (HTPB) synthetic rubber is currently the most popular fuel for hybrid rocket engines, due to its energy, and due to how safe it is to handle. Tests have been performed in which HTPB was soaked in liquid oxygen, and it still did not become explosive. These fuels are generally not as dense as solid rocket motors, so they are often doped with aluminum to increase the density and therefore the rocket performance.

=== Grain manufacturing methods ===
==== Cast ====
Hybrid rocket fuel grains can be manufactured via casting techniques, since they are typically a plastic or a rubber. Complex geometries, which are driven by the need for higher fuel mass flow rates, makes casting fuel grains for hybrid rockets expensive and time-consuming due in part to equipment costs. On a larger scale, cast grains must be supported by internal webbing, so that large chunks of fuel do not impact or even potentially block the nozzle. Grain defects are also an issue in larger grains. Traditional fuels that are cast are hydroxyl-terminated polybutadiene (HTPB) and paraffin waxes.

==== Additive manufacturing ====
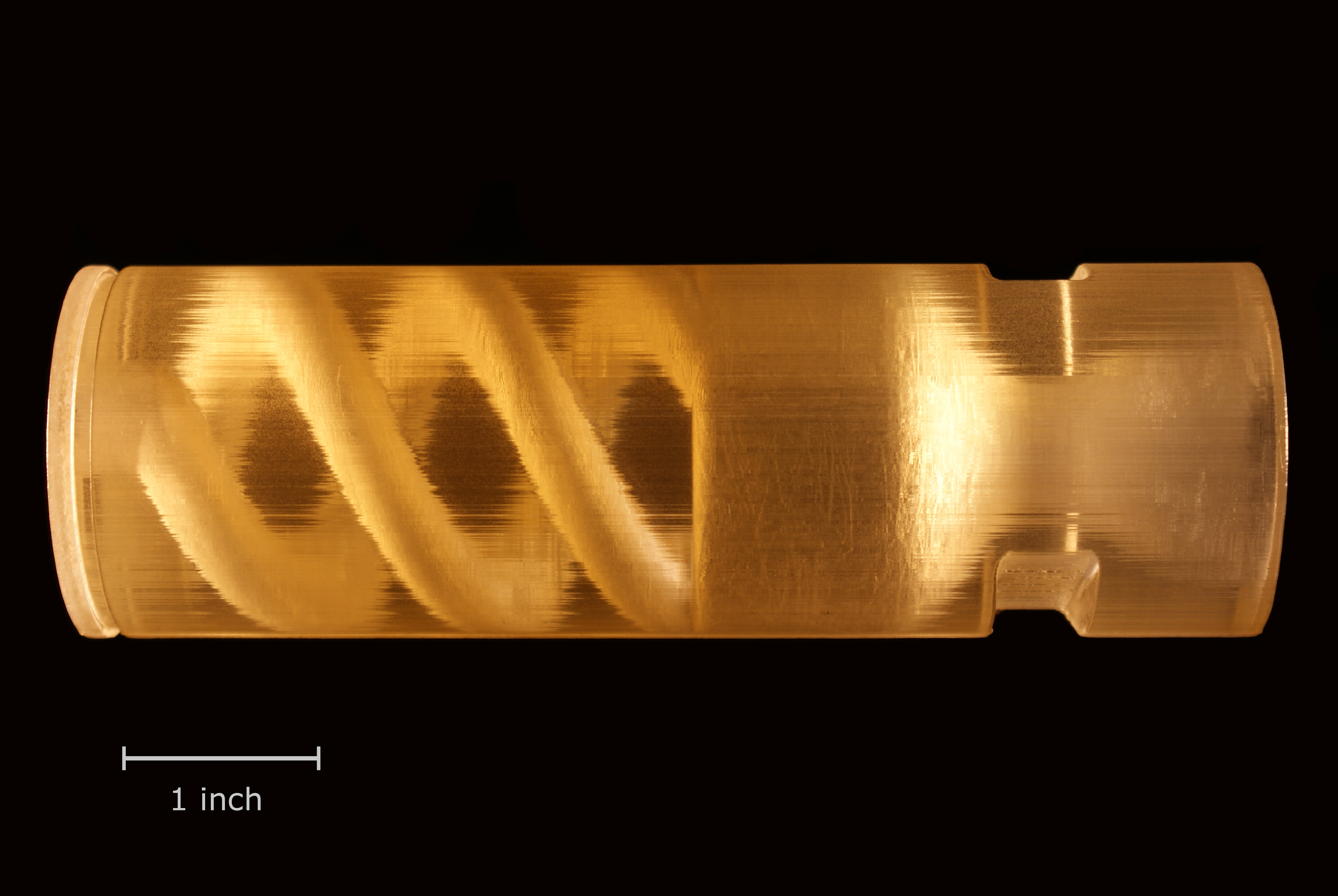
A transparent portable education demonstrator 3D-printed hybrid rocket fuel grain with dual helical fuel ports, a post-combustion chamber, and a de Laval nozzle, shown prior to hot fire test.

Additive manufacturing is currently being used to create grain structures that were otherwise not possible to manufacture. Helical ports have been shown to increase fuel regression rates while also increasing volumetric efficiency. An example of material used for a hybrid rocket fuel is acrylonitrile butadiene styrene (ABS). The printed material is also typically enhanced with additives to improve rocket performance. Recent work at the University of Tennessee Knoxville has shown that, due to the increased surface area, the use of powdered fuels (i.e. graphite, coal, aluminum) encased in a 3D printed, ABS matrix can significantly increase the fuel burn rate and thrust level as compared to traditional polymer grains.

== Oxidizer ==
=== Common oxidizer choices ===
Common oxidizers include gaseous or liquid oxygen, nitrous oxide, and hydrogen peroxide. For a reverse hybrid, oxidizers such as frozen oxygen and ammonium perchlorate are used.

Proper oxidizer vaporization is important for the rocket to perform efficiently. Improper vaporization can lead to very large regression rate differences at the head end of the motor when compared to the aft end. One method is to use a hot gas generator to heat the oxidizer in a pre-combustion chamber. Another method is to use an oxidizer that can also be used as a monopropellant. A good example is hydrogen peroxide, which can be catalytically decomposed over a silver bed into hot oxygen and steam. A third method is to inject a propellant that is hypergolic with the oxidizer into the flow. Some of the oxidizer will decompose, heating up the rest of the oxidizer in the flow.

== Hybrid safety ==
Generally, well designed and carefully constructed hybrids are very safe. The primary hazards associated with hybrids are:

- Pressure vessel failures – Chamber insulation failure may allow hot combustion gases near the chamber walls leading to a "burn-through" in which the vessel ruptures.
- Blow back – For oxidizers that decompose exothermically such as nitrous oxide or hydrogen peroxide, flame or hot gasses from the combustion chamber can propagate back through the injector, vaporising the oxidizer and mixing it with hot fuel rich gasses leading to a tank explosion. Blow-back requires gases to flow back through the injector due to insufficient pressure drop which can occur during periods of unstable combustion. Blow back is inherent to specific oxidizers and is not possible with oxidizers such as oxygen, or nitrogen tetroxide, unless fuel is present in the oxidizer tank.
- Hard starts – An excess of oxidizer in the combustion chamber prior to ignition, particularly for monopropellants such as nitrous oxide, can result in a temporary over-pressure or "spike" at ignition.

Because the fuel in a hybrid does not contain an oxidizer, it will not combust explosively on its own. For this reason, hybrids are classified as having no TNT equivalent explosive power. In contrast, solid rockets often have TNT equivalencies similar in magnitude to the mass of the propellant grain. Liquid-fuel rockets typically have a TNT equivalence calculated based on the amount of fuel and oxidizer which could realistically intimately combine before igniting explosively; this is often taken to be 10–20% of the total propellant mass. For hybrids, even filling the combustion chamber with oxidizer prior to ignition will not generally create an explosion with the solid fuel, the explosive equivalence is often quoted as 0%.

== Organizations working on hybrids ==
=== Commercial companies ===
In 1998 SpaceDev acquired all of the intellectual property, designs, and test results generated by over 200 hybrid rocket motor firings by the American Rocket Company over its eight-year life. SpaceShipOne, the first private crewed spacecraft, was powered by SpaceDev's hybrid rocket motor burning HTPB with nitrous oxide. However, nitrous oxide was the prime substance responsible for the explosion that killed three in the development of the successor of SpaceShipOne at Scaled Composites in 2007. The Virgin Galactic SpaceShipTwo follow-on commercial suborbital spaceplane uses a scaled-up hybrid motor.

SpaceDev was developing the SpaceDev Streaker, an expendable small launch vehicle, and SpaceDev Dream Chaser, capable of both suborbital and orbital human space flight. Both Streaker and Dream Chaser use hybrid rocket motors that burn nitrous oxide and the synthetic HTPB rubber. SpaceDev was acquired by Sierra Nevada Corporation in 2009, becoming its Space Systems division, which continues to develop Dream Chaser for NASA's Commercial Crew Development contract. Sierra Nevada also developed RocketMotorTwo, the hybrid engine for SpaceShipTwo. On October 31, 2014, when SpaceShipTwo was lost, initial speculation had suggested that its hybrid engine had in fact exploded and killed one test pilot and seriously injured the other. However, investigation data now indicates an early deployment of the SpaceShip-Two feather system was the cause for aerodynamic breakup of the vehicle.

U.S. Rockets manufactured and deployed hybrids using self-pressurizing nitrous oxide (N_{2}O) and hydroxyl-terminated polybutadiene (HTPB) as well as mixed High-test peroxide (HTP) and HTPB. The High-test peroxide (H_{2}O_{2}) 86% and (HTPB) and aluminum hybrids developed by U.S. Rockets produced a sea level delivered specific impulse (I_{sp}) of 240, well above the typical 180 of N_{2}O-HTPB hybrids. In addition to that, they were self-starting, restartable, had considerably lower combustion instability making them suitable for fragile or crewed missions such as Bloodhound SSC, SpaceShipTwo or SpaceShipThree. The company had successfully tested and deployed both pressure fed and pump fed versions of the latter HTP-HTPB style. Deliverables to date have ranged from 15-to-46-centimetre (6 to 18 in) diameter, and developed units up to 140-centimetre (54 in) diameter. The vendor claimed scalability to over 5-metre (200 in) diameter with regression rates approaching solids, according to literature distributed at the November 2013 Defense Advanced Research Projects Agency (DARPA) meeting for XS-1. U.S. Rockets is no longer manufacturing large-scale rockets.

Gilmour Space Technologies began testing Hybrid rocket engines in 2015 with both N_{2}O and HP with HDPE and HDPE+wax blends. For 2016 testing includes a 22,000 N (5,000 lbf) HP/PE engine. The company is planning to use hybrids for both sounding and orbital rockets.

Orbital Technologies Corporation (Orbitec) has been involved in some U.S. government-funded research on hybrid rockets including the "Vortex Hybrid" concept.

Environmental Aeroscience Corporation (eAc) was incorporated in 1994 to develop hybrid rocket propulsion systems. It was included in the design competition for the SpaceShipOne motor but lost the contract to SpaceDev. Environmental Aeroscience Corporation still supplied parts to SpaceDev for the oxidizer fill, vent, and dump system.

Rocket Lab formerly sold hybrid sounding rockets and related technology.

The Reaction Research Society (RRS), although known primarily for their work with liquid rocket propulsion, has a long history of research and development with hybrid rocket propulsion.

Copenhagen Suborbitals, a Danish rocket group, has designed and test-fired several hybrids using N_{2}O at first and currently LOX. Their fuel is epoxy, paraffin wax, or polyurethane. The group eventually moved away from hybrids because of thrust instabilities, and now uses a motor similar to that of the V-2 rocket.

TiSPACE is a Taiwanese company which is developing a family of hybrid-propellant rockets.

bluShift Aerospace in Brunswick, Maine, won a NASA SBIR grant to develop a modular hybrid rocket engine for its proprietary bio-derived fuel in June 2019. Having completed the grant bluShift has launched its first sounding rocket using the technology.

Vaya Space based out of Cocoa, Florida, is expected to launch its hybrid fuel rocket Dauntless in 2028.

Reaction Dynamics based out Saint-Jean-sur-Richelieu, Quebec, began developing a hybrid rocket engine in 2017 capable of producing 21.6 kN of thrust. Their Aurora rocket will use nine engines on the first stage and one engine on the second stage and will be capable of delivering a payload of 50–150 kg to LEO. In May 2022, Reaction Dynamics announced they were partnering with Maritime Launch Services to launch the Aurora rocket from their launch site currently under construction in Canso, Nova Scotia, beginning with suborbital test flights in Summer, 2023 with a target of 2024 for the first orbital launch.

In 2017 DeltaV Uzay Teknolojileri A.Ş. was founded by Savunma Sanayi Teknolojileri A.Ş (SSTEK), a state company of Turkey, for hybrid-propellant-rocket research. The company CEO Arif Karabeyoglu is former Consulting Professor of Stanford University in the area of rocket propulsion and combustion. According to company web site DeltaV achieved many firsts in hybrid-propellant-rocket technology including first paraffin/LOX dual fuel rocket launch, highest specific impulses for a hybrid-propellant-rocket, first sounding rocket to reach 100 km altittude, first orbital hybrid-propellant-rocket design, first orbital firing of hybrid-propellant-rocket.

=== Universities ===
Space Propulsion Group was founded in 1999 by Arif Karabeyoglu, Brian Cantwell, and others from Stanford University to develop high regression-rate liquefying hybrid rocket fuels. They have successfully fired motors as large as 12.5 in (32 cm). diameter which produce 13,000 lbf (58,000 N) using the technology and are currently developing a 24 in (61 cm) diameter, 25,000 lbf (110,000 N) motor to be initially fired in 2010. Stanford University is the institution where liquid-layer combustion theory for hybrid rockets was developed. The SPaSE group at Stanford is currently working with NASA Ames Research Center developing the Peregrine sounding rocket which will be capable of 100 km altitude. Engineering challenges include various types of combustion instabilities. Although the proposed motor was test fired in 2013, the Peregrine program eventually switched to a standard solid rocket for its 2016 debut.

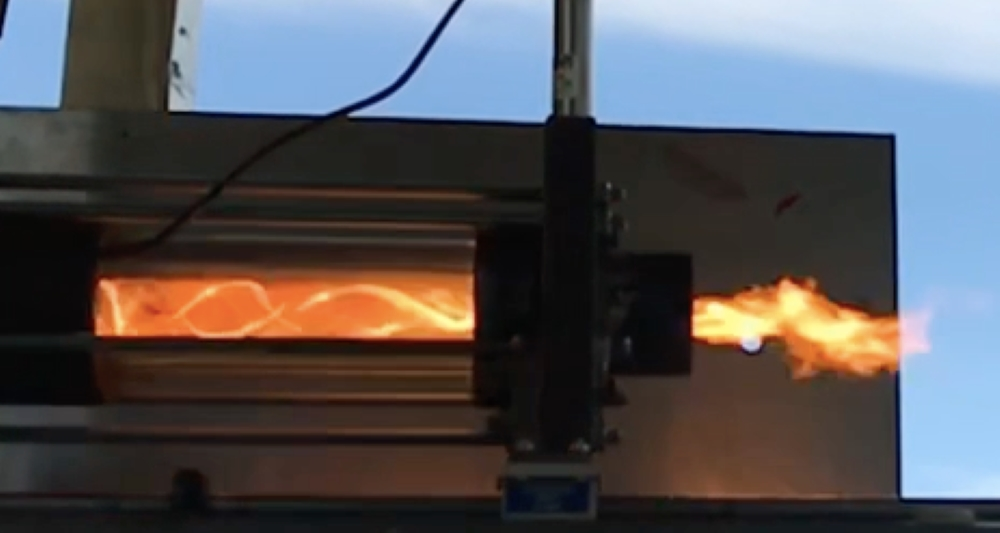
Helical oxidizer injection into a plexiglass hybrid. Image was taken during shutdown, enabling flow pattern to be seen. University of Tennessee at Knoxville.

The University of Tennessee Knoxville has carried out hybrid rocket research since 1999, working in collaboration with NASA Marshall Space Flight Center and private industry. This work has included the integration of a water-cooled calorimeter nozzle, one of the first 3D-printed, hot section components successfully used in a rocket motor. Other work at the university has focused on the use of helical oxidizer injection, bio-derived fuels and powdered fuels encased in a 3D-printed, ABS matrix, including the successful launch of a coal-fired hybrid at the 2019 Spaceport America Cup.

At the Delft University of Technology, the student team Delft Aerospace Rocket Engineering (DARE) is very active in the design and building of hybrid rockets. In October 2015, DARE broke the European student altitude record with the Stratos II+ sounding rocket. Stratos II+ was propelled by the DHX-200 hybrid rocket engine, using a nitrous oxide oxidizer and fuel blend of paraffin, sorbitol and aluminium powder. On July 26, 2018, DARE attempted to launch the Stratos III hybrid rocket. This rocket used the same fuel/oxidizer combination as its predecessor, but with an increased impulse of around 360 kNs. At the time of development, this was the most powerful hybrid rocket engine ever developed by a student team in terms of total impulse. The Stratos III vehicle was lost 20 seconds into the flight.

Florida Institute of Technology has successfully tested and evaluated hybrid technologies with their Panther Project. The WARR student-team at the Technical University of Munich has been developing hybrid engines and rockets since the early 1970s. Using acids, oxygen, or nitrous oxide in combination with polyethylene, or HTPB. The development includes test stand engines as well as airborne versions, like the first German hybrid rocket Barbarella. They are currently working on a hybrid rocket with Liquid oxygen as its oxidizer, to break the European height record of amateur rockets. They are also working with Rocket Crafters and testing their hybrid rockets.

Boston University's student-run "Rocket Propulsion Group", which in the past has launched only solid motor rockets, is attempting to design and build a single-stage hybrid sounding rocket to launch into sub-orbital space by July 2015.

Brigham Young University (BYU), the University of Utah, and Utah State University launched a student-designed rocket called Unity IV in 1995 which burned the solid fuel hydroxyl-terminated polybutadiene (HTPB) with an oxidizer of gaseous oxygen, and in 2003 launched a larger version which burned HTPB with nitrous oxide.

The University of Brasilia's (UnB) Hybrid Rocket Team initiated their endeavors in 1999 within the Faculty of Technology, marking the pioneering institution in the Southern Hemisphere to engage with hybrid rockets. Over time, the team has achieved notable milestones, encompassing the creation of various sounding rockets and hybrid rocket engines. Presently, the team is known as the Chemical Propulsion Laboratory (CPL) and is situated at Campus UnB Gama. CPL has made significant strides in the advancement of critical hybrid engine technologies. This includes the development of a modular 1 kN hybrid rocket engine for the SARA platform, an innovative methane-oxygen gas-torch ignition system, an efficient oxidizer feed system, precision flow control valves, and thrust vector control mechanisms tailored for hybrid engines. Additionally, they've achieved a breakthrough with a 3D-printed, actively cooled hybrid rocket engine. Furthermore, the Laboratory is actively engaged in diverse areas of research and development, with current projects spanning the formulation of hybrid engine fuels using paraffin wax and N2O, numerical simulations, optimization techniques, and rocket design. CPL collaborates extensively with governmental agencies, private investors, and other educational institutions, including FAPDF, FAPESP, CNPq, and AEB. A notable collaborative effort includes the Capital Rocket Team (CRT), a group of students from UnB, who are currently partnering with CPL to develop hybrid sounding rockets. In a remarkable achievement, CRT clinched the top spot in the 2022 Latin American Space Challenge (LASC).

University of California, Los Angeles's student-run "Rocket Project at UCLA" launches hybrid propulsion rockets using nitrous oxide as an oxidizer and HTPB as the fuel. They are currently in the development process of their fifth student-built hybrid rocket engine.

University of Toronto's student-run "University of Toronto Aerospace Team", designs and builds hybrid engine powered rockets. They are currently constructing a new engine testing facility at the University of Toronto Institute for Aerospace Studies, and are working towards breaking the Canadian amateur rocketry altitude record with their new rocket, Defiance MKIII, currently under rigorous testing. Defiance MK III's engine, QUASAR, is a Nitrous-Paraffin hybrid engine, capable of producing 7 kN of thrust for a period of 9 seconds.

In 2016, Pakistan's DHA Suffa University successfully developed Raheel-1, hybrid rocket engines in 1 kN class, using paraffin wax and liquid oxygen, thereby becoming the first university run rocket research program in the country. In India, Birla Institute of Technology, Mesra Space engineering and rocketry department has been working on Hybrid Projects with various fuels and oxidizers.

Pars Rocketry Group from Istanbul Technical University has designed and built the first hybrid rocket engine of Turkey, the rocket engine extensively tested in May 2015.

A United Kingdom-based team (laffin-gas) is using four N_{2}O hybrid rockets in a drag-racing style car. Each rocket has an outer diameter of 150 mm and is 1.4 m long. They use a fuel grain of high-density wound paper soaked in cooking oil. The N_{2}O supply is provided by Nitrogen-pressurised piston accumulators which provide a higher rate of delivery than N_{2}O gas alone and also provide damping of any reverse shock.

In Italy one of the leading centers for research in hybrid propellants rockets is CISAS (Center of Studies and Activities for Space) "G. Colombo", University of Padua. The activities cover all stages of the development: from theoretical analysis of the combustion process to numerical simulation using CFD codes, and then by conducting ground tests of small scale and large-scale rockets (up to 20 kN, N_{2}O-Paraffin wax based motors). One of these engines flew successfully in 2009. Since 2014, the research group is focused on the use of high test peroxide as oxidizer, in partnership with "Technology for Propulsion and Innovation", a university of Padua spin-off company.

In Taiwan, hybrid rocket system developments began in 2009 through R&D projects of NSPO with two university teams. Both teams employed nitrous oxide / HTPB propellant system with different improvement schemes. Several hybrid rockets have been successfully launched by NCKU and NCTU teams so far, reaching altitudes of 10–20 km. Their plans include attempting 100–200 km altitude launch to test nanosatellites, and developing orbital launch capabilities for nanosatellites in the long run. A sub-scale N_{2}O/PE dual-vortical-flow (DVF) hybrid engine hot-fire test in 2014 has delivered an averaged Isp of 280 sec, which indicates that the system has reached around 97% combustion efficiency.

In (Germany) the University of Stuttgart's Student team HyEnD is the current world record holder for the highest-flying student-built hybrid rocket with their HEROS rockets.

In Bangladesh, Amateur Experimental Rocketry Dhaka supported by the American International University Bangladesh has also tested the country's first hybrid rocket engine, and are now working towards larger paraffin/nitrous oxide based prototypes.

The Aerospace Team of the TU Graz, Austria, is also developing a hybrid-propellant rocket.

The Polish Student team PWr in Space at Wrocław University of Science and Technology has developed three hybrid rockets: R2 "Setka", R3 "Dziewięćdziesiątka dziewiątka" and the most powerful of all - R4 "Lynx" with a successful test at their test stand

Many other universities, such as Embry-Riddle Aeronautical University, the University of Washington, Purdue University, the University of Michigan at Ann Arbor, the University of Arkansas at Little Rock, Hendrix College, the University of Illinois, Portland State University, University of KwaZulu-Natal, Texas A&M University, Aarhus University, Rice University, and AGH University of Science and Technology have hybrid motor test stands that allow for student research with hybrid rockets.

=== High power rocketry ===
There are a number of hybrid rocket motor systems available for amateur/hobbyist use in high-powered model rocketry. These include the popular HyperTek systems and a number of 'Urbanski-Colburn Valved' (U/C) systems such as RATTWorks, Contrail Rockets, and Propulsion Polymers. All of these systems use nitrous oxide as the oxidizer and a plastic fuel (such as Polyvinyl chloride (PVC), Polypropylene), or a polymer-based fuel such as HTPB. This reduces the cost per flight compared to solid rocket motors, although there is generally more ground support equipment required with hybrids.

== In popular culture ==
An October 26, 2005 episode of the television show MythBusters entitled "Confederate Rocket" featured a hybrid rocket motor using liquid nitrous oxide and paraffin wax. The myth purported that during the American Civil War, the Confederate Army was able to construct a rocket of this type. The myth was revisited in a later episode entitled Salami Rocket, using hollowed out dry salami as the solid fuel.

In the February 18, 2007, episode of Top Gear, a Reliant Robin was used by Richard Hammond and James May in an attempt to modify a normal K-reg Robin into a reusable Space Shuttle. Steve Holland, a professional radio-controlled aircraft pilot, helped Hammond to work out how to land a Robin safely. The craft was built by senior members of the United Kingdom Rocketry Association (UKRA) and achieved a successful launch, flew for several seconds into the air and managed to successfully jettison the solid-fuel rocket boosters on time. This was the largest rocket launched by a non-government organisation in Europe. It used 6 × 40960 NS O motors by Contrail Rockets giving a maximum thrust of 8 tonnes. However, the car failed to separate from the large external fuel tank due to faulty explosive bolts between the Robin and the external tank, and the Robin subsequently crashed into the ground and seemed to have exploded soon after. This explosion was added for dramatic effect as neither Reliant Robins nor hybrid rocket motors explode in the way depicted.

== See also ==
- Spacecraft propulsion
