= Pars Rocketry =

Rocketry team at Istanbul Technical University

Pars Rocketry Team
- Pars Roket Takımı
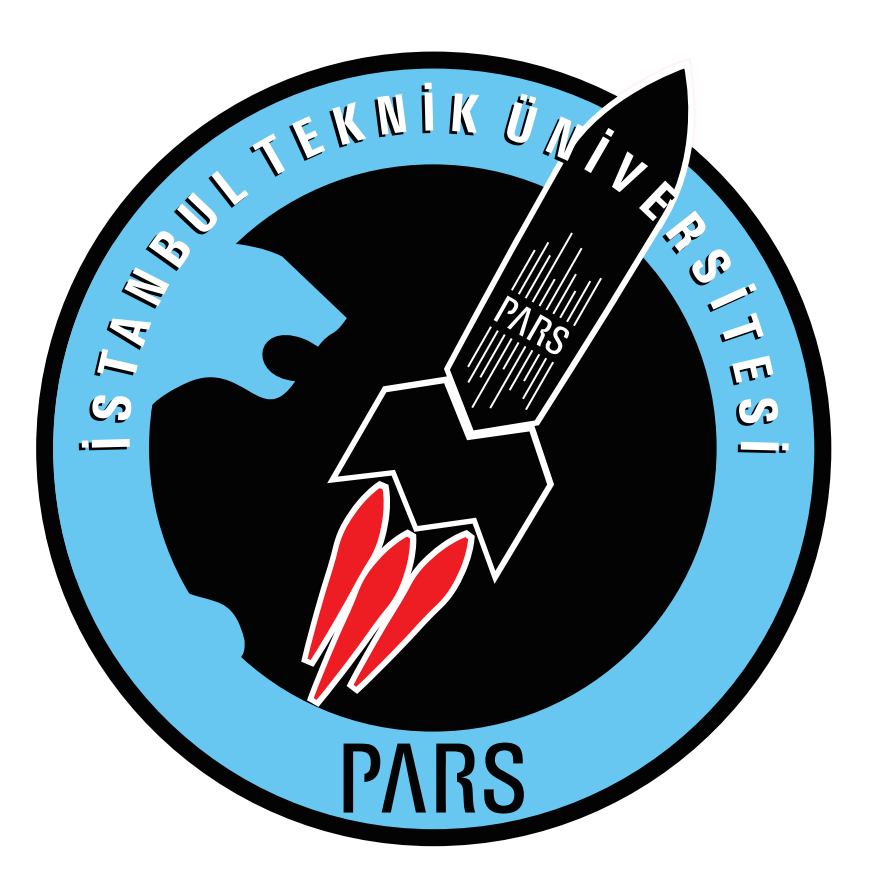
- logo of the team
- Formation: June 2012; 14 years ago
- Founded at: Istanbul Technical University
- Type: Student society
- Coordinates: 41°6′2.8″N 29°1′15.7″E
- Website: www.parsroket.com/indexEn.html

Pars Rocketry Group or Pars Rocketry Team is a high power rocketry organization founded in June 2012.

It is formed by students from Istanbul Technical University's various engineering majors. By means of owning Tripoli Level 2 Rocketry Certification, Pars is the only civilian organization that has been allowed to launch the most powerful rocket engines in Turkey. Goals of the Pars stated as raising awareness for rocketry among educational structures together with designing and producing unique rocket subsystems for all manner of missions.

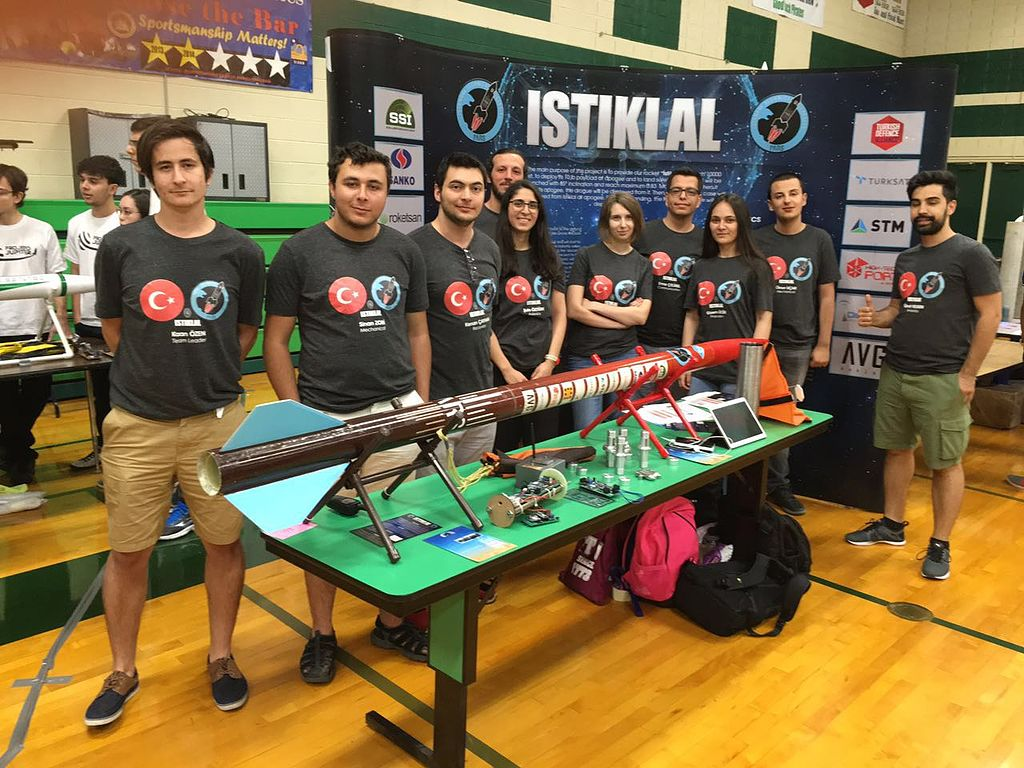
Pars Rocketry Group's stand in IREC 2016 with competition team, augmented reality presentations and the rocket "Istiklal"

Pars has developed original designs and produced them for their own uses such as engine shells, a launch pad and a rocket engine test stand. They have constructed numerous rockets and stored blueprints for further use. Pars has formed Turkish sources over 450 pages about rocketry regulations and delivered them to Grand National Assembly of Turkey. The first hybrid rocket engine fired in Turkey has been drafted and manufactured by Pars Rocketry. In addition to attending several fairs, Pars participates in the Intercollegiate Rocket Engineering Competition, which is the World's Largest University Rocket Engineering Competition, every year since 2014. In June 2016, Pars Rocketry Group's rocket "Istiklal" won the 6th position among 44 teams from all around the world. The team is still working on hybrid rocket engines. The team took part in the Teknofest organization with their rockets .In such organizations, they organize some trainings for amateur rocketers.
