= American Rocket Company =

Hybrid rocket developer (1985–1996)

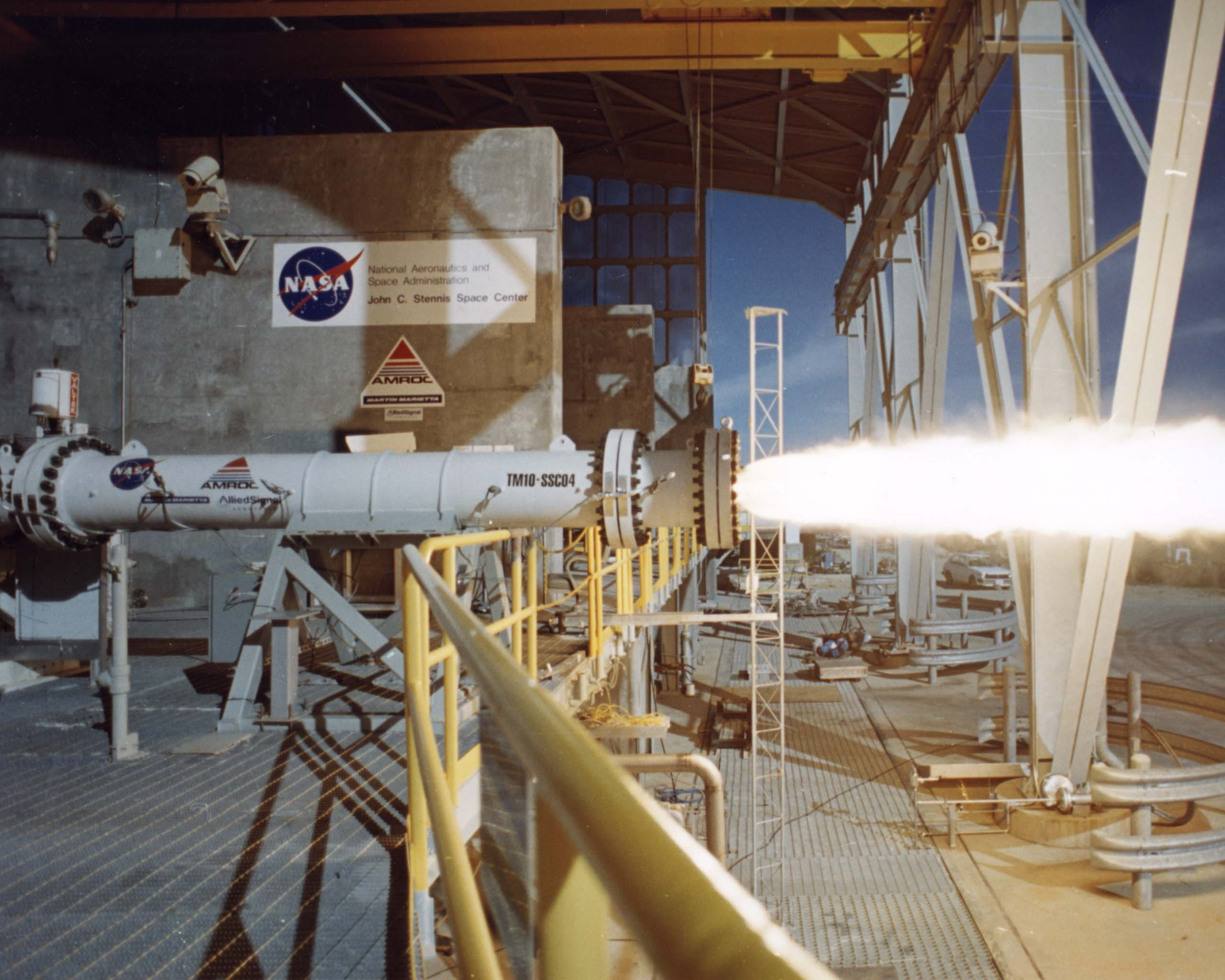
AMROC test of 10,000 pounds-force (44 kN) thrust hybrid rocket motor in 1994 at Stennis Space Center.

The American Rocket Company, or AMROC, was a California-based company that developed hybrid rocket motors, founded in 1985 by George A. Koopman, Bevin McKinney and Jim Bennett, veterans of Starstruck Inc.

It had over 300 hybrid rocket motor test firings in its lifetime, ranging from 4.5 kN to 1.1 MN at the Air Force Astronautics Laboratory at Edwards Air Force Base (merged into the Phillips Laboratory) and NASA's Stennis Space Center's E1 test stand where it test fired the world's only successful 250,000 pound force (1.1 MN) thrust liquid oxygen/polybutadiene hybrid rocket motor.

The company attempted a sea launch of its Dolphin rocket in 1984. After two early aborts the third attempt ended with a shutdown command after Dolphin reached 700 meters altitude with a 45° deviation from vertical due to a failure of a valve in the thrust vector control. The rocket was entirely privately funded.

Its 5 October 1989 launch of the SET-1 sounding rocket was unsuccessful due to frozen moisture from the air forming an ice plug under the main Liquid Oxygen Valve allowing only 30% of the flow needed for launch.

The company became insolvent and was shut down in May 1996. Its intellectual property was acquired in 1999 by SpaceDev, and its lineage is part of SpaceShipOne (AMROC worked on an N2O-HTPB engine for its SLIMSET sounding rocket effort).
