= National Videogame Museum =

National Videogame Museum may refer to:

- National Videogame Museum (United States)
- National Videogame Museum (United Kingdom)
- National Videogame Museum (The Netherlands)

== See also ==
- List of video game museums
