= List of video game museums =

This list of video game museums shows video game museums in the world

== Video game museums ==
Museum	Location	Website
ACMI	Melbourne, Australia	Website
American Classic Arcade Museum	Laconia, NH, USA	Website
Bonami SpelComputer Museum	Zwolle, Netherlands	Website
Centre for Computing History	Cambridge, England	Website
Chicago Gamespace	Chicago, USA	Website
Computerspielmuseum Berlin	Berlin, Germany	Website
Digital Game Museum	California, USA	Website
Finnish Museum of Games	Tampere, Finland	Website
Gameorama	Lucerne, Switzerland	Website
GamePlaza	Zurich, Switzerland	Website
Museu do Videogame Itinerante	Várias cidades, Brasil	Website
GAMM Game Museum	Rome, Italy	Website
Le Musée du Jeu Vidéo	Arcueil, France	Website
Museum of Art and Digital Entertainment	Oakland, CA, USA	Website
Museum of Pop Culture – Permanent exhibit entitled Indie Game Revolution	Seattle, WA, USA	Website
Museum of Soviet Arcade Machines	Moscow, Russia	Website
Museum of Soviet Arcade Machines	Saint Petersburg, Russia	Website
Muzeul Jocurilor Video	Reșița, Romania	
National Video Game History Museum	Miami, USA	Website
National Videogame Museum	Zoetermeer, the Netherlands	Website
National Videogame Museum	Sheffield, England	Website
National Videogame Museum	Frisco, TX, USA	Website
Nexon Computer Museum	Jeju-do, South Korea	Website
Nintendo Museum	Uji, Kyoto Prefecture, Japan	Website
The Nostalgia Box	Perth, Australia	Website
OXO Museo Madrid	Madrid, Spain	Website
Retro Video Game Museum – small permanent exhibit area inside of The Gamesmen Computer game store	Sydney, Australia	Website
The Strong National Museum of Play – houses the International Center for the History of Electronic Games and the World Video Game Hall of Fame	Rochester, NY, USA	Website
Video Game History Museum	Zagreb, Croatia	Website
Video Game Museum of CADPA	Shanghai, China	Website
Video Games Museum	Heraklion, Greece	Website

=== Defunct video game museums ===
Museum	Location	Last day of operations
National Videogame Arcade	Nottingham, UK	2018
Retro Gaming Museum	Cocoa, FL, USA	May 2025

== Online video game museums ==
Museum	Website	Notes
Museu Bojogá de Jogos Eletrônicos	Website	
Israel Video Games Museum	Website	
Museum of Computer Adventure Game History	Website	
Computer Gaming World Museum	Website	Virtual museum based on the magazine Computer Gaming World
The Video Game Museum	Website	
The Video Games Museum	Website	
Videospielarchiv München	Website	
Greek Video Games	Website	Explore the world of Greek video games and those inspired by Greece - from indie titles and historical adventures to popular online games.
Retro Video Game Museum	Website	
Femicom Museum	Website	Collects and archives historic games that fall under the category of 'Girl Games'
Museo del Videojuego	Website	Videogame console database, accessories, computers, library, and videogames as well, etc.

== See also ==
- List of museums
- Video game
- List of computer museums
