= Video Game History Museum =

Video game museum in Zagreb, Croatia

Coordinates: 45°48′47″N 15°59′00″E

- Muzej povijesti videoigara
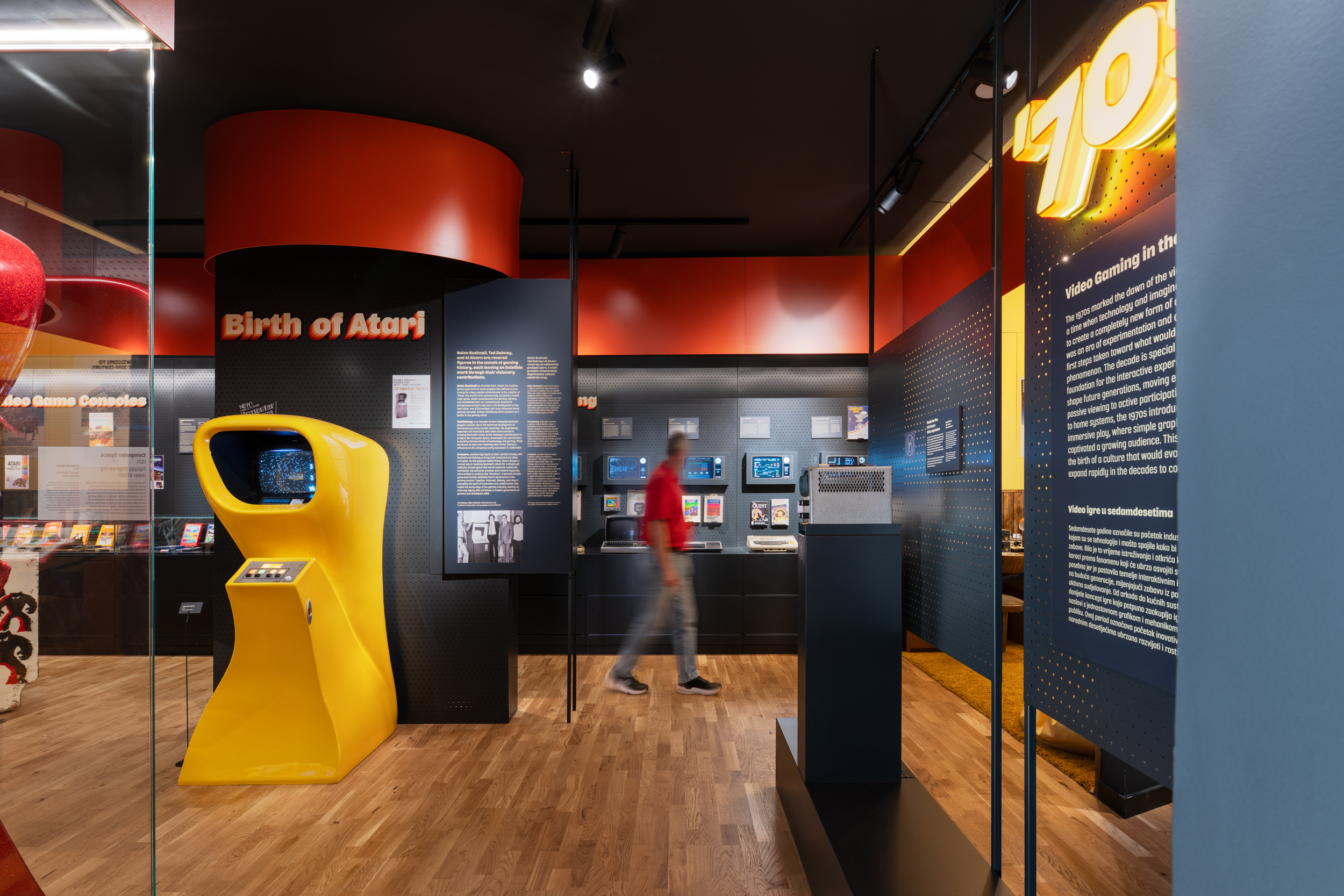
- Video Game History Museum Zagreb, Croatia
- Established: May 31, 2025
- Location: Draškovićeva 10, Zagreb, Croatia
- Type: Video game museum
- Collection size: More than 3,000 exhibits on permanent display
- Founder: Damir Šlogar
- Website: www.vghm.hr/en/

The Video Game History Museum (Croatian: Muzej povijesti videoigara, abbreviated VGHM) is a video game museum in Zagreb, Croatia. The museum is dedicated to the history of video games, computer games and gaming culture, with a permanent exhibition covering the development of the medium from the 1960s to the early 2000s.

The museum opened to the public on 31 May 2025 at Draškovićeva 10 in central Zagreb. It occupies more than 800 square metres across three floors and displays more than 3,000 exhibits on permanent view, selected from a larger private collection assembled over several decades. The permanent exhibition represents only part of the founder's complete collection, which continues to grow through the acquisition of new artefacts.

== History ==
Announced in February 2025 and reported by the Croatian Press Agency, the museum opened its doors to the public on 31 May 2025. Croatian media outlets Croatia Week and tportal reported that over two million euros were privately invested into the museum, alongside a private collection of video games, early computers, consoles, arcade machines, artwork and memorabilia acquired over nearly three decades.

This museum marks the first project of its kind for the founder, reflecting his career spent between the video game industry's hubs in Europe and North America.

In January 2026 the museum unveiled Croatian Video Game History, a permanent exhibition about the development of Croatia's video game and computer game industry. It covers early computing education, pioneering publisher Suzy Soft, early Croatian games, the studio Croteam, and specialist gaming magazines. The exhibition's opening was preceded by a panel discussion featuring computing pioneer Damir Muraja, credited with developing Croatia's first commercially successful video game, Kung-Fu (1984); games designer Janko Mršić-Flögel; and Croteam art director Admir Elezović. During the event, computing pioneer Branimir Makanec received VGHM's inaugural Lifetime Achievement Award for his contribution to the development of video games in Croatia, which was accepted on his behalf by his son, Julije Makanec.

The museum celebrated its first anniversary on 31 May 2026, offering free tours to visitors and a lecture given by American video game designer Don Daglow. Croatian media outlets Večernji list and Croatia Week reported that the museum had attracted approximately 40,000 visitors in its first year of operation.

== Collection and exhibition ==
The permanent exhibition is arranged chronologically and presents the development of video games through arcade machines, home consoles, personal computers, handheld systems, software, peripherals, printed material, artwork and promotional objects. The exhibition includes interactive displays that allow visitors to play some of the systems on display.

A review by Visit Croatia described the museum as flowing through decades of video game history, with timeline displays, games and consoles, and reconstructed teenager's rooms representing the 1980s, 1990s and 2000s. HRT listed several early or historically notable exhibits in the museum, including Tennis for Two, Computer Space, the Magnavox Odyssey, Pong and the Microvision.

The museum also presents the history of game publishers, designers and hardware manufacturers. Its Croatian video game history exhibition includes original material relating to domestic developers and publications and is part of the museum's permanent display.

== Awards and recognition ==
In 2025, the museum received the Zagreb Design Week Award in the Spatial Design category. Bug reported that the award was given by an international jury from among 17 interior and exterior design projects, and that the museum's interior and exhibition design were created by Clinica Studio. Dom i dizajn, a Jutarnji list publication, also reported that the museum received the award for best museum spatial design at Zagreb Design Week.

The museum is listed as a Croatian member of the European Federation of Game Archives, Museums and Preservation Projects. Večernji list reported in 2026 that the museum was also a member of ICOM and NEMO.

== See also ==
- List of museums in Croatia
- List of video game museums
- Video game preservation
