= HomeComputerMuseum =

Computer museum in Helmond, the Netherlands

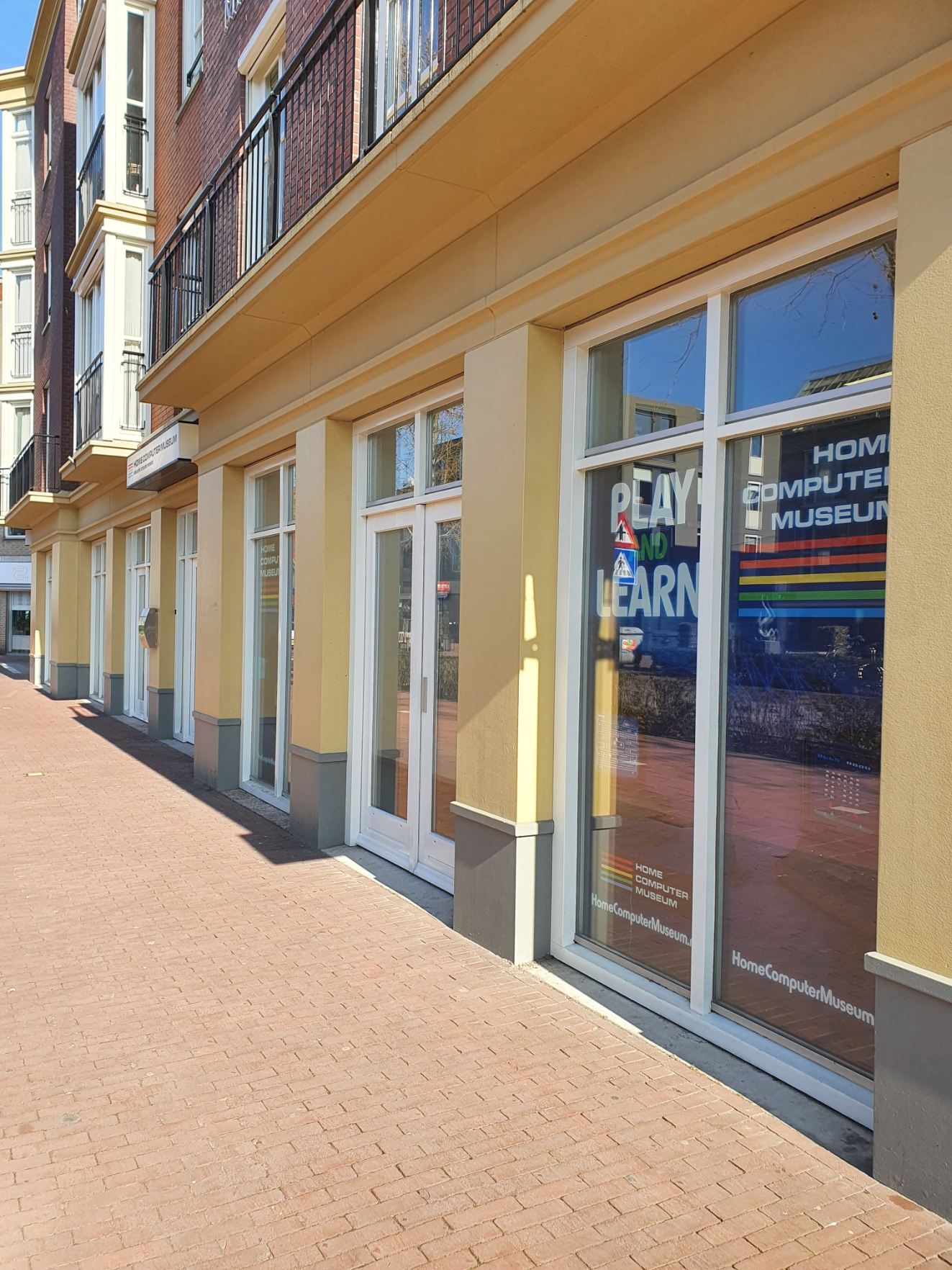
- Front of HomeComputerMuseum 2021
- Established: 17 March 2018
- Location: Noord Koninginnewal 28, Helmond, Netherlands
- Coordinates: 51°28′46.47″N 5°39′28.96″E
- Type: Computer museum
- Collection size: 20,000 objects
- Director: Bart van den Akker
- Website: homecomputer.museum

The HomeComputerMuseum is an interactive computer museum specialized in the history of the home computer. The museum is located in the city of Helmond in the Netherlands.

== Description ==
The museum was opened on 17 March 2018, at Kluisstraat 3–5. Due to a lack of space and an expiring rental contract, it was soon necessary to look for another space. On 2 February 2020, the museum moved to its current location on de Noord Koninginnewal 28 in Helmond.

The HomeComputerMuseum presents a chronological representation of the computer as it can be used at home. It is fully interactive where all computers may be used by visitors. The official mission is: Preserve and share the history of the home computer for and with current and future generations.

The original collection is owned by Bart van den Akker, the founder of the museum. Over the years, other (computer) collectors have also exhibited (parts of) their collection at the museum, creating a complete story of the history of the home computer.

== Collection ==
The museum has a clear focus on the history of the home computer. There are hardly any large company computers to be found and the collection starts in the mid-1970s with, among other things, the Altair 8800.

Chronologically, all large and small computer brands pass by and the collection of most brands is complete until 2006. For example, nearly the entire history of Commodore (including all Amigas), Atari, Sinclair, Apple (including the complete Apple II series and the first Apple Lisa in the Netherlands), MSX, Kaypro, Tandy, Philips and Tulip working present. Many smaller brands personal computers are also present.

Some unique items in the museum:

- The Commodore Amiga 4000 used for the movie Titanic (1997).
- A Commodore Amiga 2500UX from the NASA.
- The world's largest collection of boxed PC games.
- the world's largest collection CD-i.
- Largest collection of Philips computers.
- Largest collection Tulip Computers.
- Working Aesthedes.
- Commodore 64 from Jeroen Tel.
- Amiga 1200 from Psygnosis
- Oldest IBM PC in the Netherlands.

The museum pays special attention to the (lost) Dutch computer brands such as Tulip, Philips, Holborn, Genisys/G2, Laser Computers and others.

== Awards and Social functions ==
The museum is committed to people with a distance to the labor market, in particular people with an autism spectrum disorder. Within the museum, these are guided to a permanent job where people will also remain employed for a long time. In addition to museum tasks, some commercial tasks are also performed, such as a repair service, digital heritage and appraisals. This makes the non-profit company operating independently and independent of subsidies or sponsors.

This mix of culture (heritage), social and commercial serves as an example for many museums and government bodies, including Cultural Heritage Agency of the Netherlands and International Council of Museums. The museum has received several awards for its social commitment:

- Heritage Prize 2019 of Heritage Brabant.
- Carat Cultuurprijs 2020 from the Carat Foundation, Helmond

== See also ==
- National Videogame Museum
