= Ivel Ultra =

Croatian personal computer

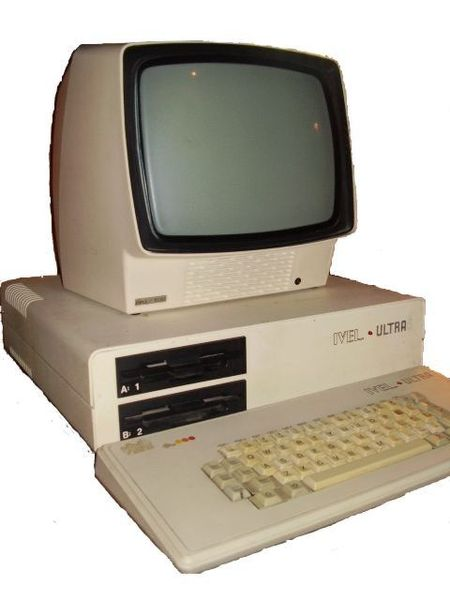
- Ivel Ultra Model 2
- Developer: Branimir Makanec
- Manufacturer: Ivasim Electronika
- Type: Home computer
- Generation: 8-bit
- Released: 1984
- Discontinued: 1990
- Operating system: IDOS, CP/M (with second Z80 CPU)
- CPU: MOS Technology 6502 at 1 MHz
- Memory: 64 KB
- Removable storage: 5.25" floppy disks
- Display: 280 x 192 pixels, 6 colors
- Backward compatibility: Apple II

The Ivel Ultra is an 8-bit Yugoslav Apple II compatible computer designed by Branimir Makanec and developed by Ivasim Electronika in the 1980s.

It was produced in two different versions: the first version has a brown case and ran from 1984 to 1986, the second has a white case and ran from 1987 to 1990.

The machine was equipped with one or two 5.25" floppy disk drives. It came with an Apple I compatible BASIC language. The operating system, called IDOS, is compatible with Apple DOS 3.3.

The Ivel Ultra could be equipped with a second Zilog Z80 processor, in order to offer compatibility with the CP/M operating system.

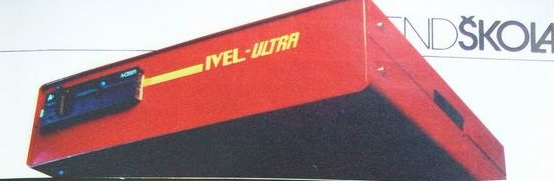
Ivel Ultra model 1

== Specifications ==
- CPU: MOS Technology 6502 at 1 MHz
- ROM: 12 KB (BASIC language interpreter and machine language monitor)
- RAM: 64 KB
- Graphic mode: 280 x 192 pixels, 6 colors
- Text mode: 40 x 24
- Operating system: IDOS, compatible with Apple DOS 3.3, CP/M (with an added Z80 CPU)
