= Aesthedes =

Computer graphics and design system

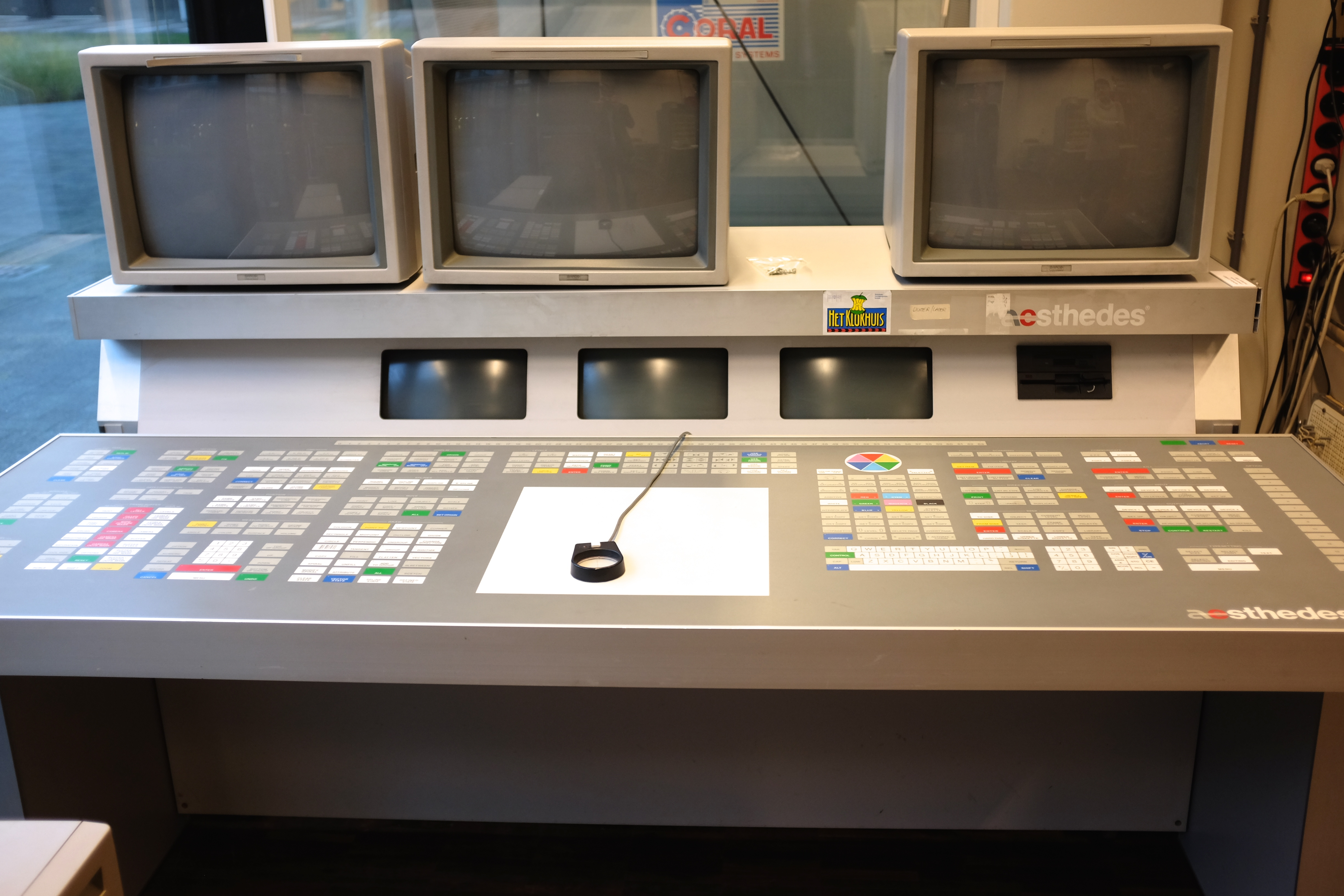
- Developer: Claessens Product Consultants
- Type: Computer-aided design system
- Released: 1984
- Operating system: Microware OS-9
- CPU: 10x Motorola 68000 (Model 1), 2x Motorola 68020 (Model 2)
- Display: 3x 12" data displays, 3x 20" Barco RGB colour monitors
- Graphics: 4x Thomson EF9365

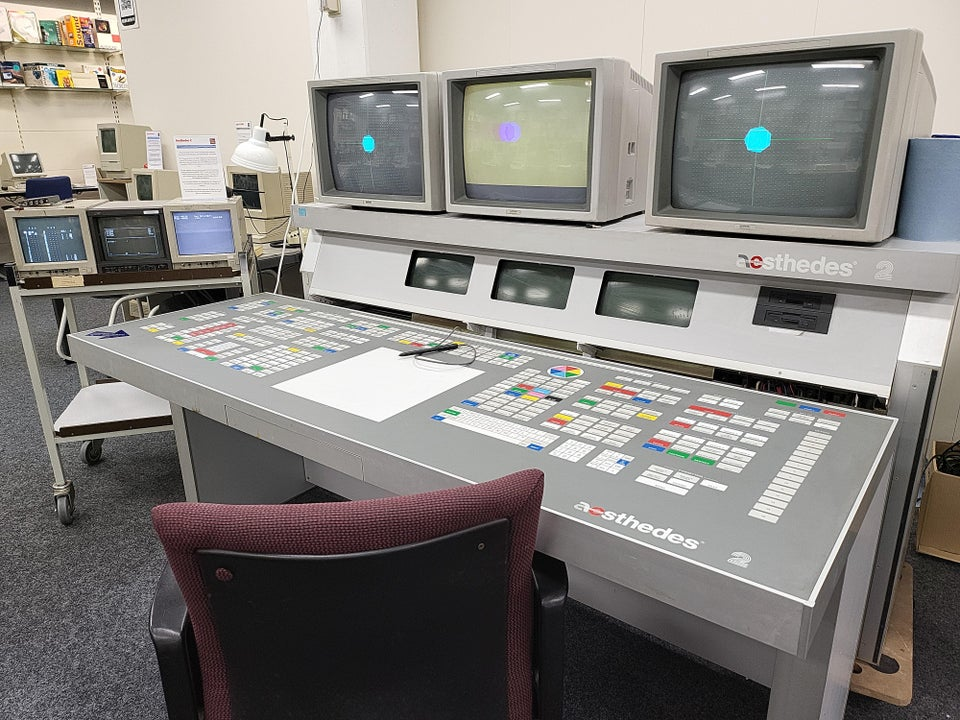
Restored and functional Aesthedes 2 with external data screens at the HomeComputerMuseum

The Aesthedes was a computer graphics or computer-aided design (CAD) system designed and developed in the 1970s and 1980s by Claessens Product Consultants (now Cartils) in Hilversum, Netherlands.

The Aesthedes was introduced to the market in 1984 by D.P.G. Claessens (1922–2019) who, after studying monumental art at the State Academy of Art in Amsterdam, studied Industrial Design.

He started a Product Development company in 1960, Claessens Product Consultants (now Cartils) in Hilversum, with clients such as Heineken, Amstel, Bijenkorf, Philips, Douwe Egberts, Friese Vlag, Bols, etc. In the mid-1960s, he started experimenting with electronic equipment to support his design work.

A growing need within his company for such equipment that did not exist before led to the development of the Aesthedes. The vision of Dominique Claessens was that a designer should be able to start immediately, without knowledge of computers. Meeting the need of designers to be able to use their creative brain, without being hindered by switching to the cognitive part of their brain, a keyboard was developed that matched the layout of the creative designer's desk. Everything had to be within reach and no overlapping of windows, for example. For that reason, the Aesthedes has 6 screens. 3 Data screens (below) showing project data, RGB values of the layer and the last 10 commands executed.

The computer was launched commercially in 1985 from Aesthedes offices in Hilversum, London, Cologne and Los Angeles. The first version was equipped with ten Motorola 68000 microprocessors, three 20” full colour, high-resolution screens and three small data display screens. It was unique at the time for being able to manipulate B-splines (a type of curve) in real time and to produce camera ready (i.e. ultra-high resolution) finished artwork for use in offset printing or other printing processes, including photogravure.

The 3 screens above are from left to right the "Zoom screen" on which a drawing can be zoomed up to 100x, the "Creation" screen in the middle where the total image of all layers is on top of each other and the right screen on which the current working layer can be seen and on which any animations can be seen.

The 3 color monitors show 16 million colors at a resolution of 512 x 512. There are 64 layers available on which you can work with a canvas of 64000 x 64000 units. These units could be defined (Define Scale) to a project's needs. Small when working on a postage stamp, or huge when working on large format prints. A legendary example was to define a unit in such a way that a map of The Netherlands was at real life scale, so actual distances could be measured in kilometers on screen.

One of the earliest customers in the Netherlands for an Aesthedes CAD system was the state printer, SDU, which uses the machine to design various hard-to-forge works, including parts of the Dutch 25-guilder note Jaap Drupsteen (the "robin"). Aesthedes was also used extensively in the design of Heineken and Amstel beer bottle labels. Its launch customer in the UK was Marks & Spencer, which used it to design signage and food packaging. The supermarket Asda and design agencies such as Michael Peters & Partners and Holmes & Marchant were among other early customers. The Apple Macintosh revolutionized the graphic design world and rendered the Aesthedes effectively obsolete. The company was sold by Claessens to Barco.

== Specifications ==
=== Aesthedes 1 ===
- CPU: 10x Motorola 68000
- RAM: 1.9 MB RAM
- Storage: 2x diskette stations (3.5" and 5.25")
- OS: Microware OS-9-based operating system in ROM (normally not visible to the designer/operator)
- Display: 3x 12" data displays, 3x 20" Barco RGB colour monitors
- Weight: 220 kg without colour monitors
- Resolution: 512*512 24-bit colour pixels in frame buffer
- Support for RGB

=== Aesthedes 2 ===
- CPU: 2x Motorola 68020
- GPU: 4x Thomson EF9365 graphic display processors
- RAM: 1.9 MB RAM
- VRAM: 2.4 MB graphic memory (64 levels)
- Storage: 2x 385 MB hard disks, 2x diskette stations (3.5" and 5.25" or 3,5")
- OS: Microware OS-9-based operating system from hard disk
- Display: 3x 12" data displays, 3x 20" Barco RGB colour monitors
- Weight: 220 kg without colour monitors
- Resolution: 512*512 24-bit colour pixels in frame buffer
- Support for CMYK and RGB

== Gallery ==
Aesthedes facility in Belgium, mid 1980s

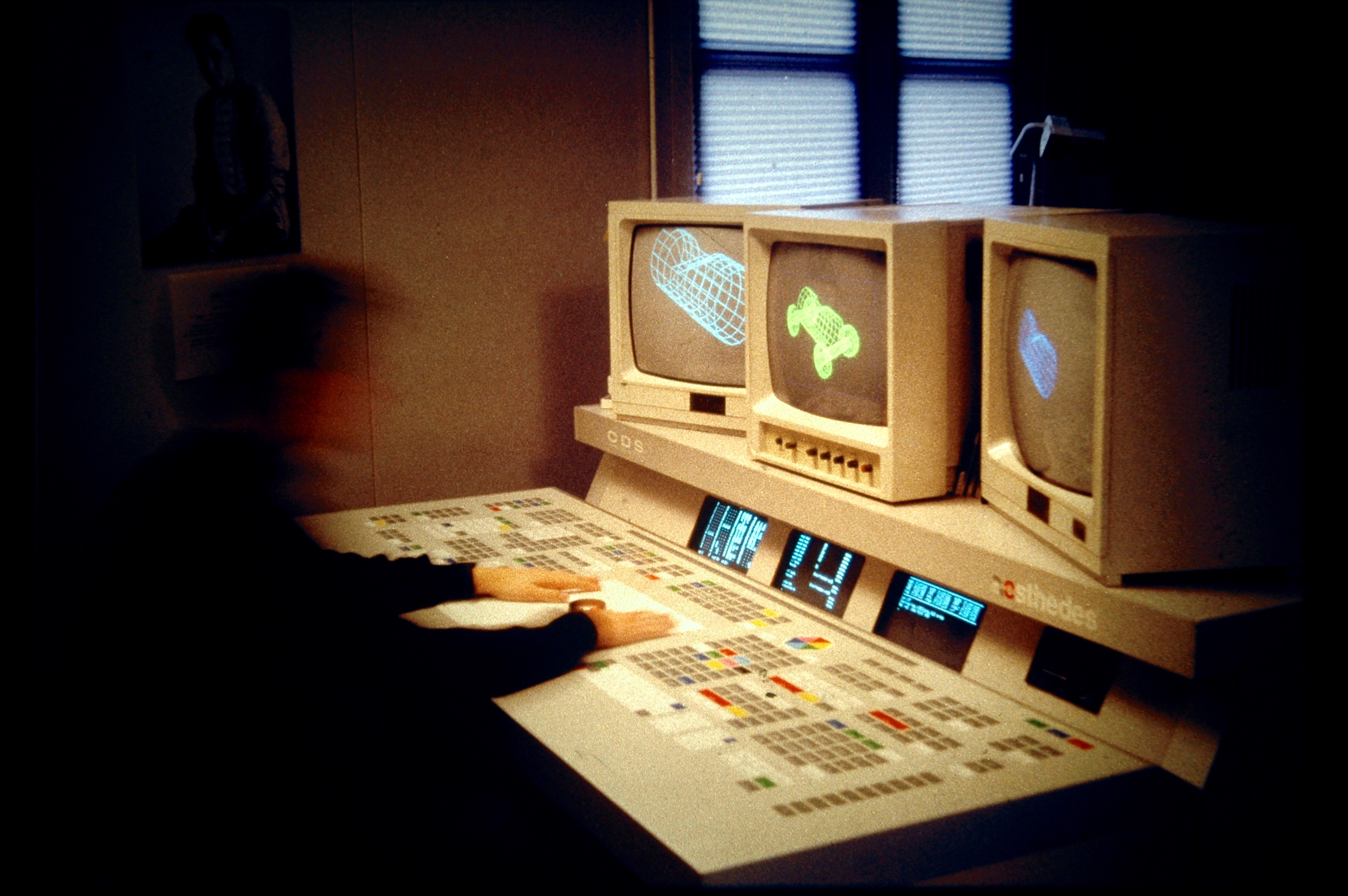
Aesthedes 1, at the company Computer Aided Visuals in Amsterdam

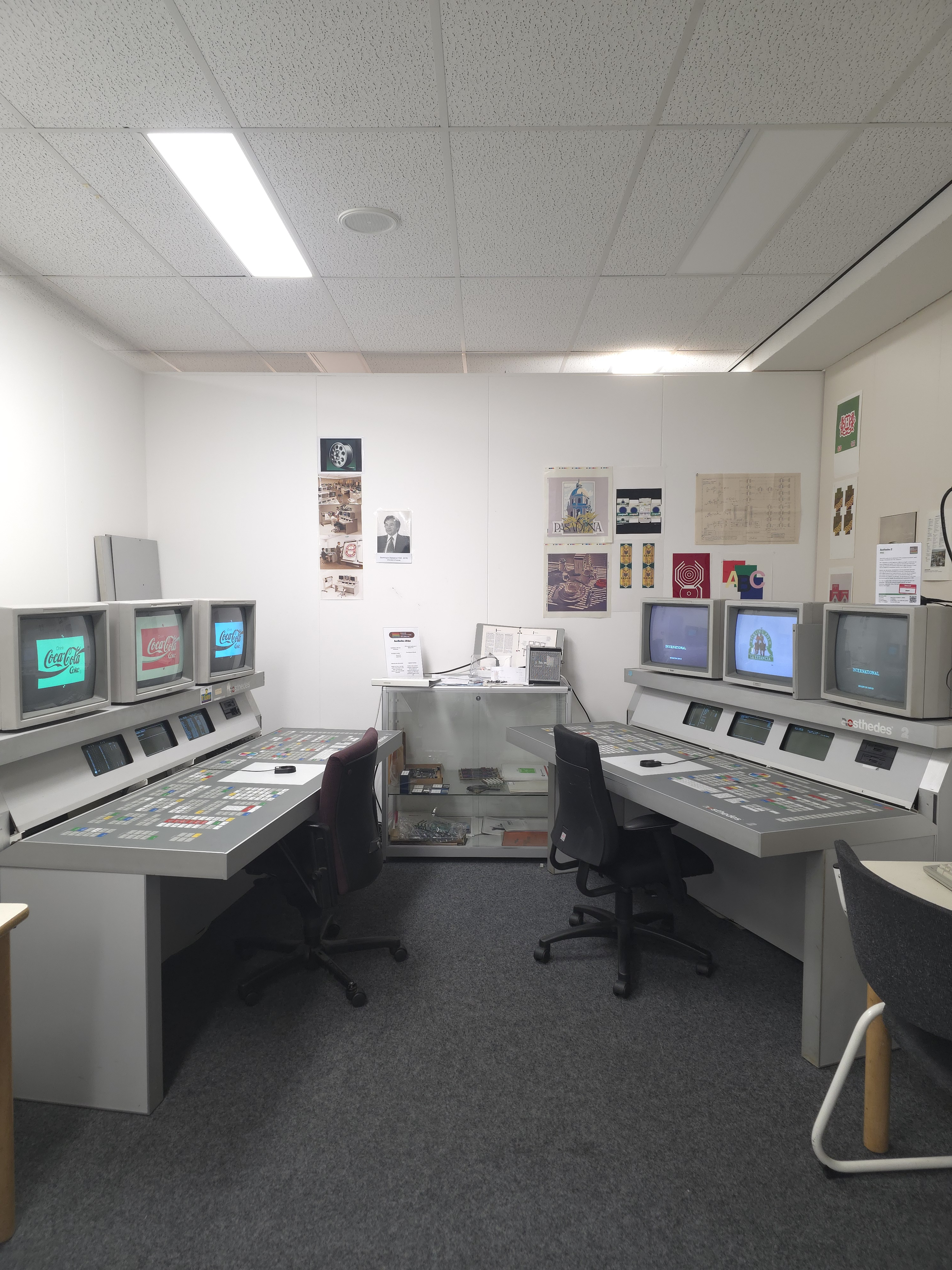
2 working Aesthedes computers in 2025 as seen in the HomeComputerMuseum

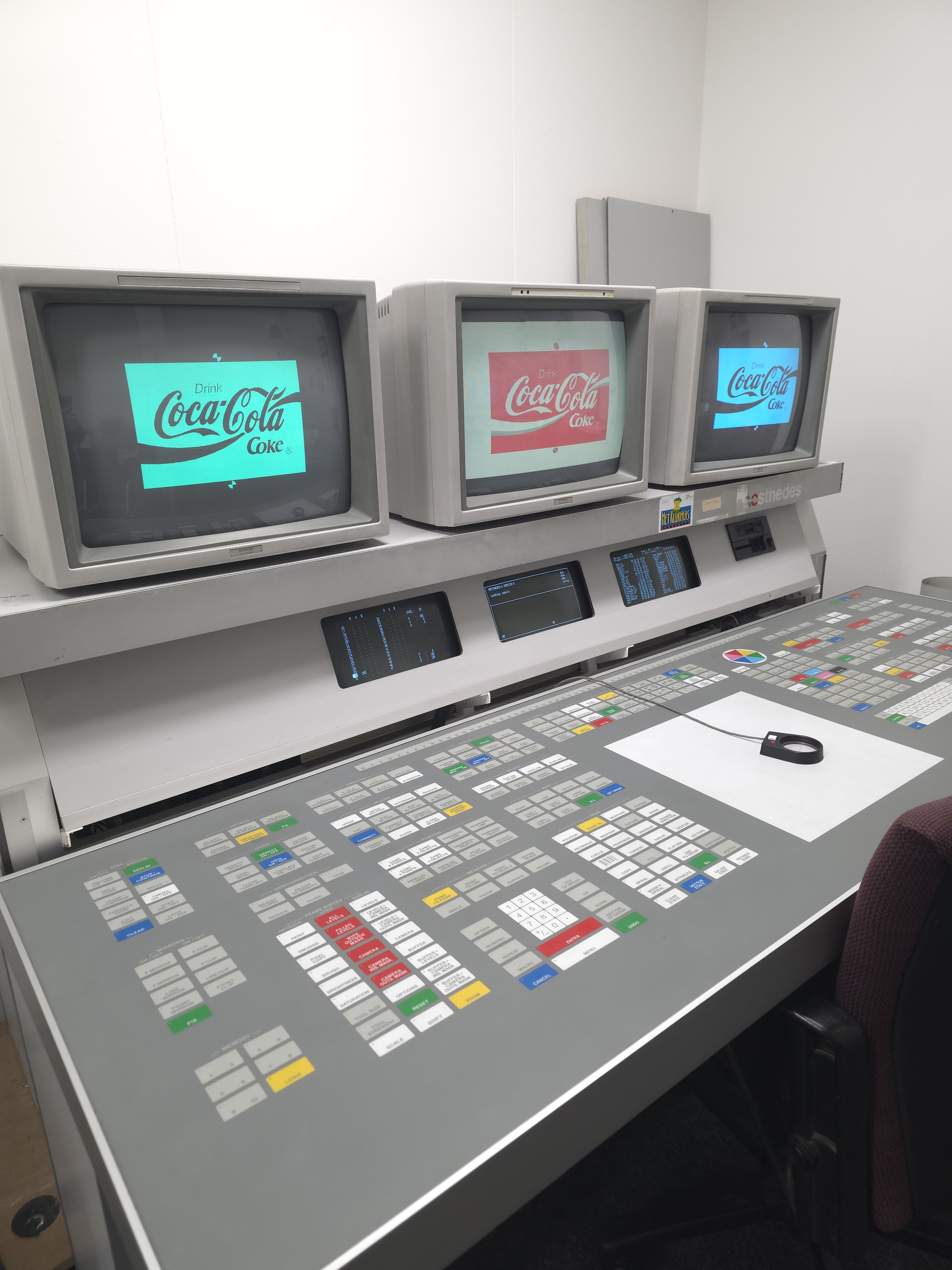
Aesthedes that was originally at the University of Amsterdam, now in the HomeComputerMuseum

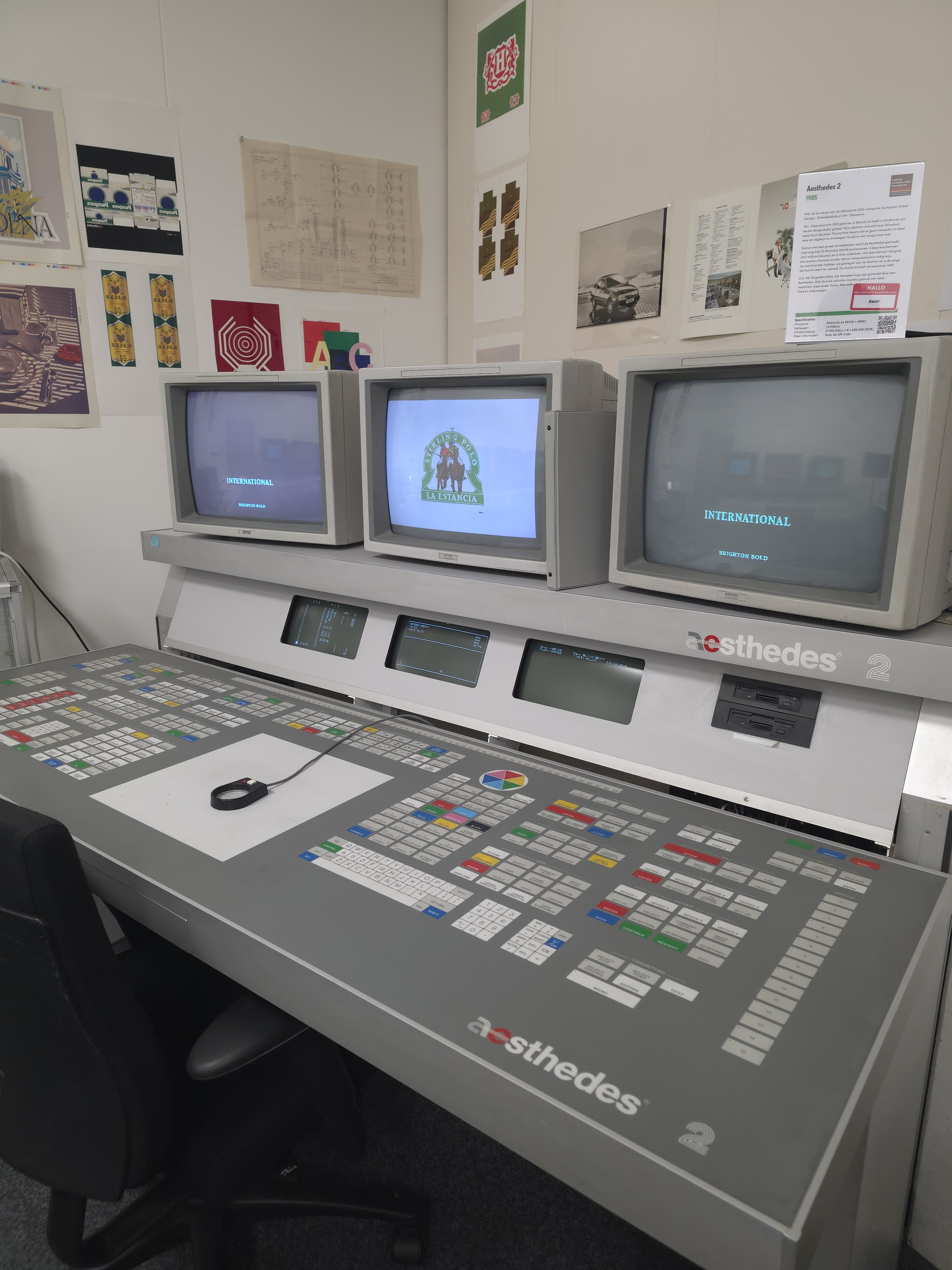
Fully restored Aesthedes 2 as seen in the HomeComputerMuseum
