= Video Game Museum of Rome =

Video game museum in Via Sabotino, Rome

VIGAMUS
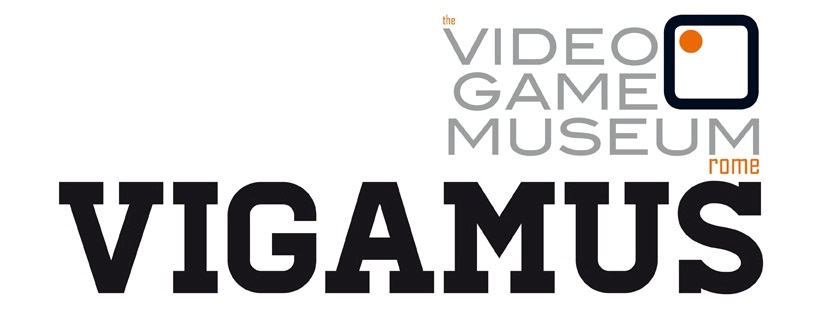
- Established: 20 October 2012
- Location: Via Sabotino 4, 00195, Rome
- Type: Video game museum
- Website: www.vigamus.com

The Video Game Museum of Rome (VIGAMUS) is an interactive video game museum that displays the history of video games. The first official announcement for the museum was at the Italian Videogame Developer Conference (IVDC) in 2010. The museum opened its doors to the public in October 2012. VIGAMUS is among the founding members and promoters of EFGAMP, the European Federation of Game Archives, Museums, and Preservation Projects. This federation aims to find new opportunities of digital preservation, with a particular attention to video games.

Located in a large exhibition center, the museum is divided into different areas of video game history, starting with the Magnavox Odyssey. The collection displays 440 pieces of video game ephemera and has more than 100 panels with information about the history and background of the items displayed. Fifteen video game retrospectives give the viewers first-person knowledge of making certain games.

In addition to the regular exhibits, the museum also has different interactive areas for arcade games, console games, and an Oculus VR room.

Some of the unique items featured at the museum include the DOOM master disks and Crytek demo disks. The museum partnered with Crytek to launch a graduate course aimed at virtual reality development. The museum also has its own magazine called VMag about the video game industry.

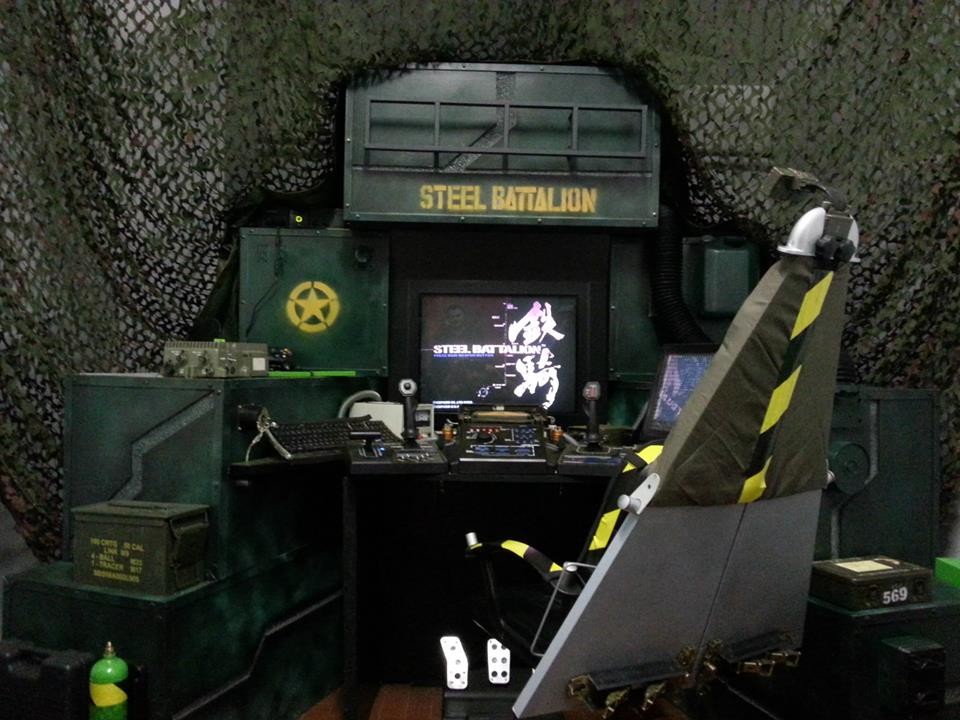
VIGAMUS Steel Battalion

== Video game tournaments and conventions ==
The museum often hosts themed nights or tournaments, such as their Dark Souls III Day and the 20th Anniversary of Pokémon Tournament. The museum invites guests to play in a tournament to win versions of the newly released games or themed prizes.

In November 2016, the museum partnered with the Leonardo Caltagirone Group to launch GAMEROME, a new video game convention.

== Interactive areas ==
=== Console ===
The console interactive areas feature 36 stations for visitor use, with new games added frequently. There are different themed corners and rooms, such as areas for The Witcher series of books and video games, and the SEGA Corner.

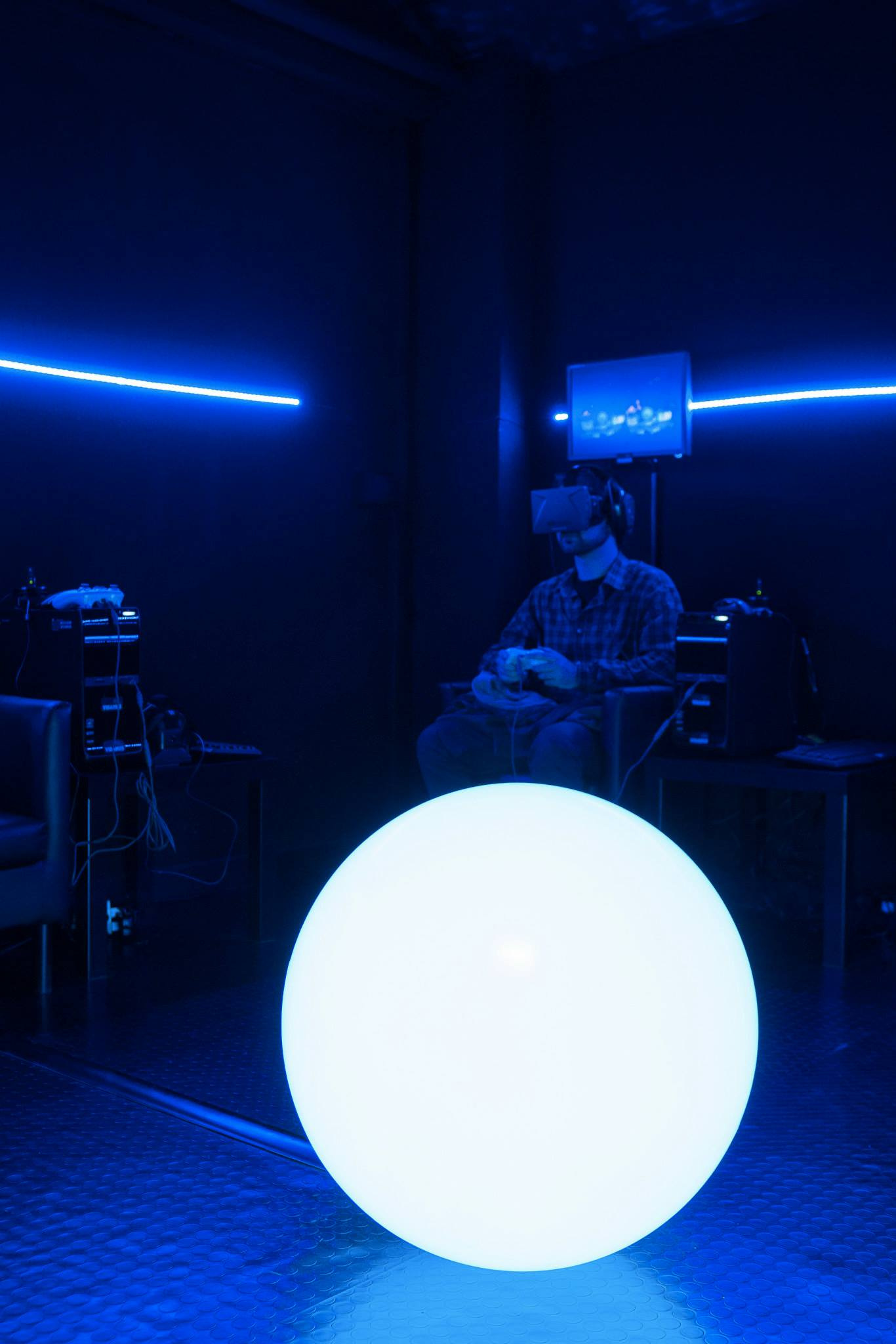
Oculus Room VIGAMUS

=== Arcade ===
VIGAMUS has a large collection of Arcade cabinets from the '80s and '90s and some of their featured games include:

- Street Fighter II
- Tekken Tag Tournament 2
- Neo Geo MVS

=== Oculus room ===
Launched in June 2016, this room houses the Oculus Rift DK2, sponsored by ASUS, visitors have a chance to play a variety of games in VR.
