= The Nostalgia Box =

Nostalgia Box
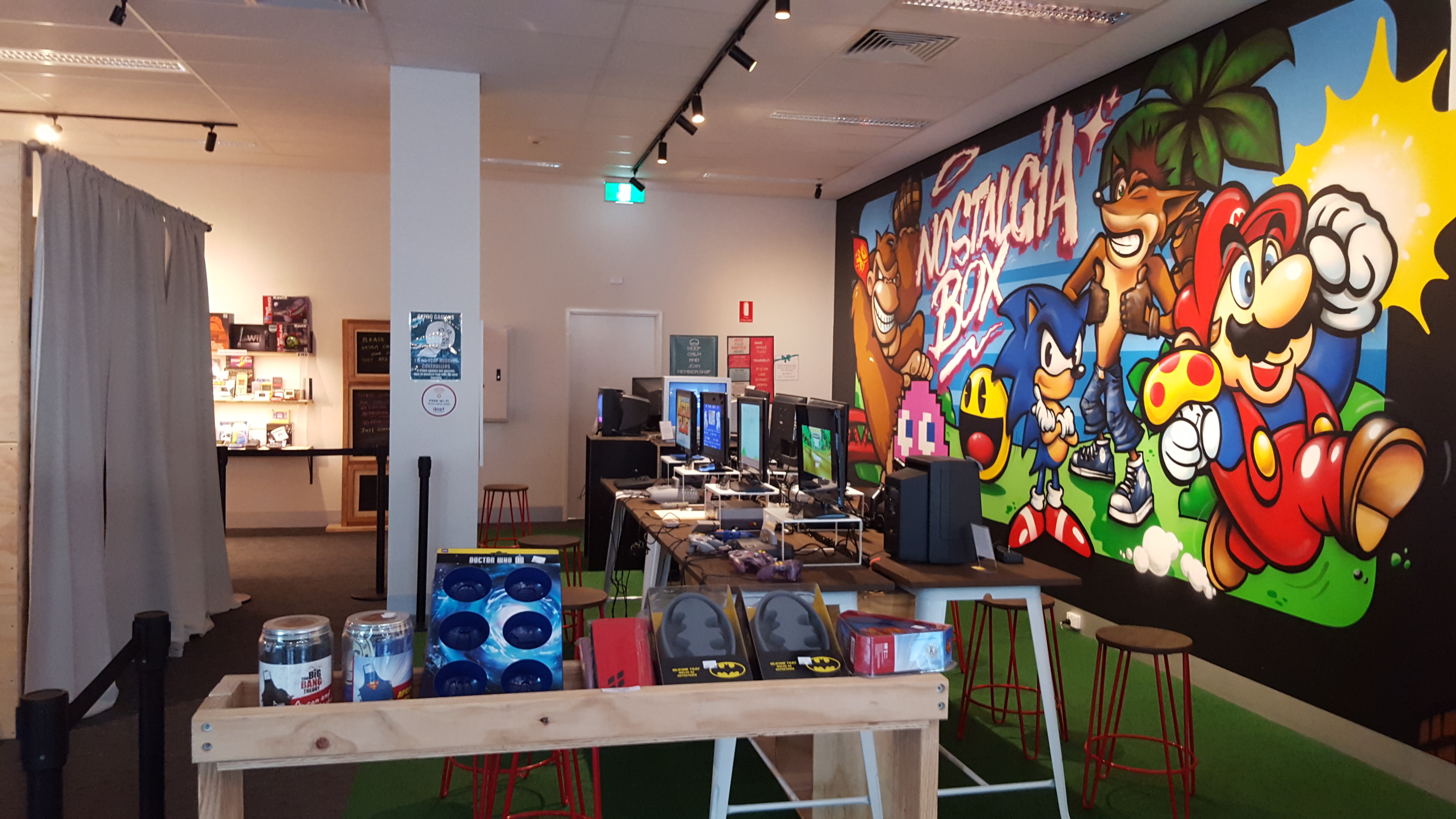
- The original arcade area
- Established: 16 December 2015
- Location: Perth
- Coordinates: 31.9442°S 115.8464°E
- Type: Video game museum
- Collection size: Over 100
- Founder: Jessie Yeoh
- Director: David Green
- Owner: David Green
- Public transit access: Green CAT bus, stop 37
- Website: thenostalgiabox.com.au

The Nostalgia Box is a video game museum located in Perth, Western Australia. It is the first interactive video game console museum in Australia. Founded by Jessie Yeoh, it was purchased by David Green in 2019.

== Permanent exhibits ==
Over a hundred video game consoles spanning four decades, starting in the 1970s with the Magnavox Odyssey with the PlayStation 3 and Xbox 360 being the latest consoles on display, feature in the exhibit space. The permanent exhibits have been set up chronologically to show the progression of the gaming industry and are meant to be a "stroll down memory lane" as well as a "crash course in the history of gaming".

== Arcade area ==
The museum features an interactive gaming arcade in addition to its permanent exhibits, allowing visitors to play a variety of video games. Included are games such as Pong, Space Invaders, Super Mario Bros., Sonic the Hedgehog and Crash Bandicoot. Fourteen different consoles are available, such as the Atari 2600 and Nintendo 64, as well as five arcade cabinets, including NBA Jam.

== Northbridge Locations ==
When first founded, The Nostalgia Box was located in Unit 3 of 16 Abdereen Street. It was sized at 144 square meters (1,550 sq ft) . Upon entering the store a front desk was set up to take ticket entry. Patrons would move to the left and see the display of consoles on both sides as it went around the corner taking up 2 walls of the unit. At the end there were tables set up with about 10-15 consoles for people to play as well as a few arcade machines.

In early 2020, due to planned renovations in the building, the museum had to move from the side unit to the bigger space at the front, Unit 1. This space was 215 square meters (2,314 sq ft) which facilitated larger venue sections and more consoles. The layout was similar in design to the first location but had more of an S shape of the museum. Patrons would once again be greeted by a front desk and then follow the path through the museum to the expanded arcade area. Now there were approximately 20-25 consoles available to play as well as more arcade machines and a rest area with a couch and bar.

The planned building renovations never eventuated due to the COVID-19 pandemic and lockdown restrictions.

== West Perth Location ==
In early 2023, the museum moved to bigger premises of 367 square metres (3,950 sq ft) in West Perth at City West.

The museum design from the previous location was kept and expanded upon. Patrons would enter and turn to their right, following multiple S shape paths to view the video game consoles. Many of the consoles that were in storage due to limited space in the Northbridge locations were now able to be displayed including newer consoles such as the Playstation3 and Xbox One, and rarer consoles such as the PSX.

The space also allowed for a larger arcade area, now able to have over 35 consoles with the arcade machines and more able to be brought out during larger events.

There was also an expansion of the relaxing area and a new Kidz Zone where families with younger children can sit and play. The new location also had a bar area per-installed.

== Video Game Mural Walls ==
The Nostalgia Box has always featured artistic murals depicting video game characters and are a key feature in every location. The original mural in the first Northbridge location was created by artist Dan Duggan.

The murals that followed in the second Northbridge location and the West Perth location were designed by the owner David Green and painted by artist Joseph Boin who goes by the handle Art By Destroy. The mural in West Perth stands almost 5 meters tall and 7 meters long, making it the biggest mural for The Nostalgia Box to date.

The other murals at the West Perth location in the arcade area depicting a combination of the Super Mario Bros Level 1-World 1 and Duck Hunt were painted by Bec Abdy.

== Gallery ==
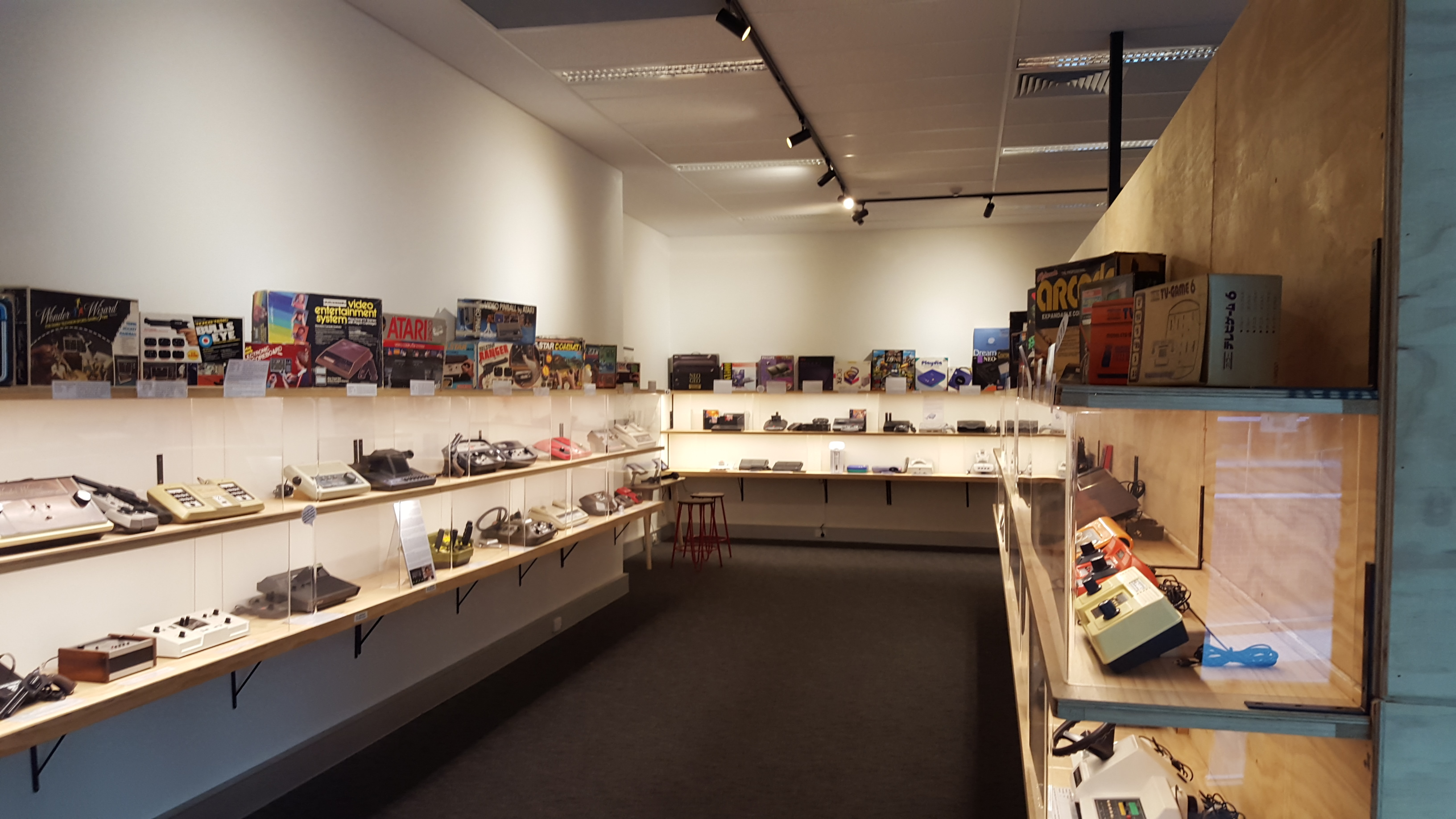
Console Museum Space (Original Northbridge Location)

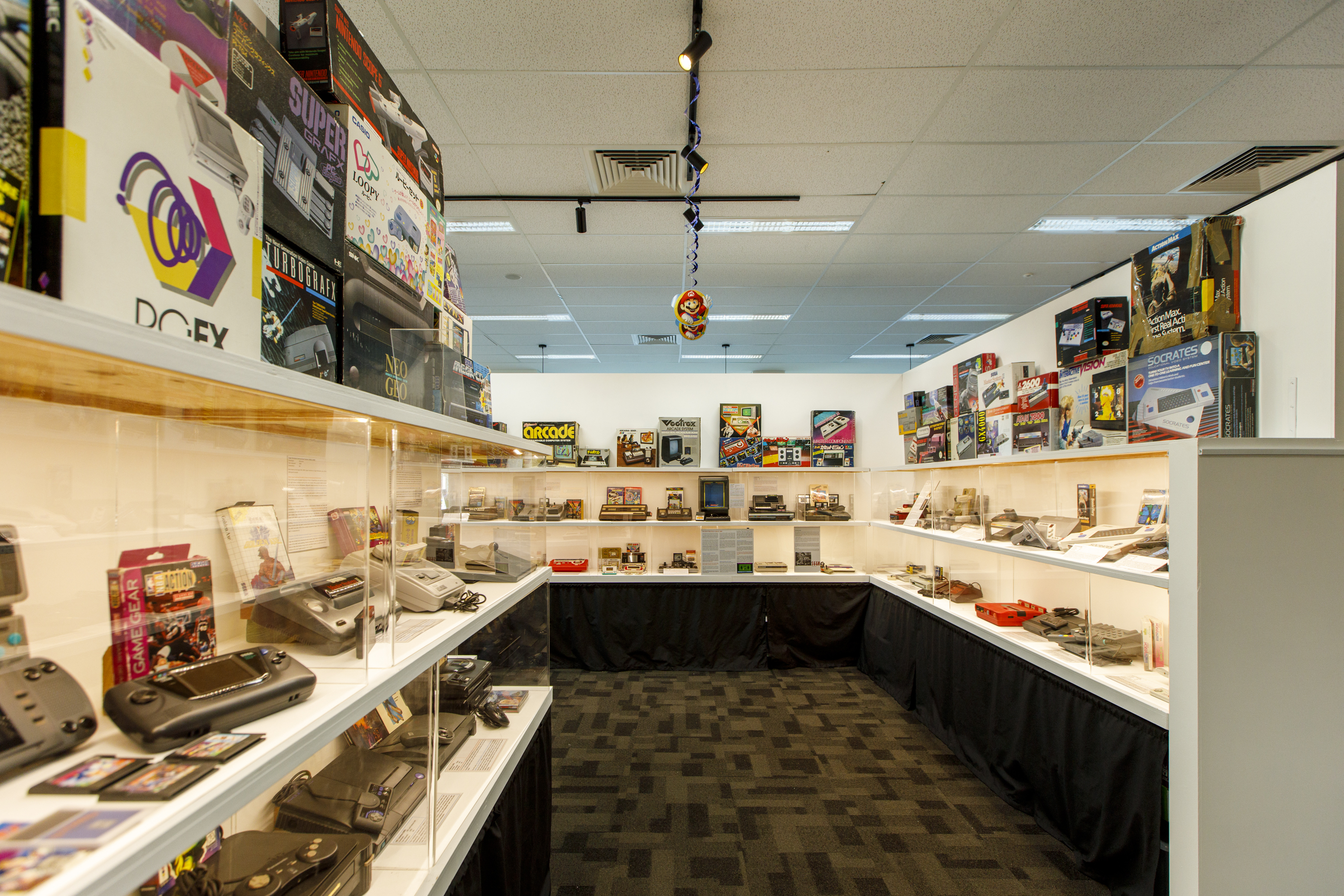
Console Museum Space (2nd Northbridge Location)

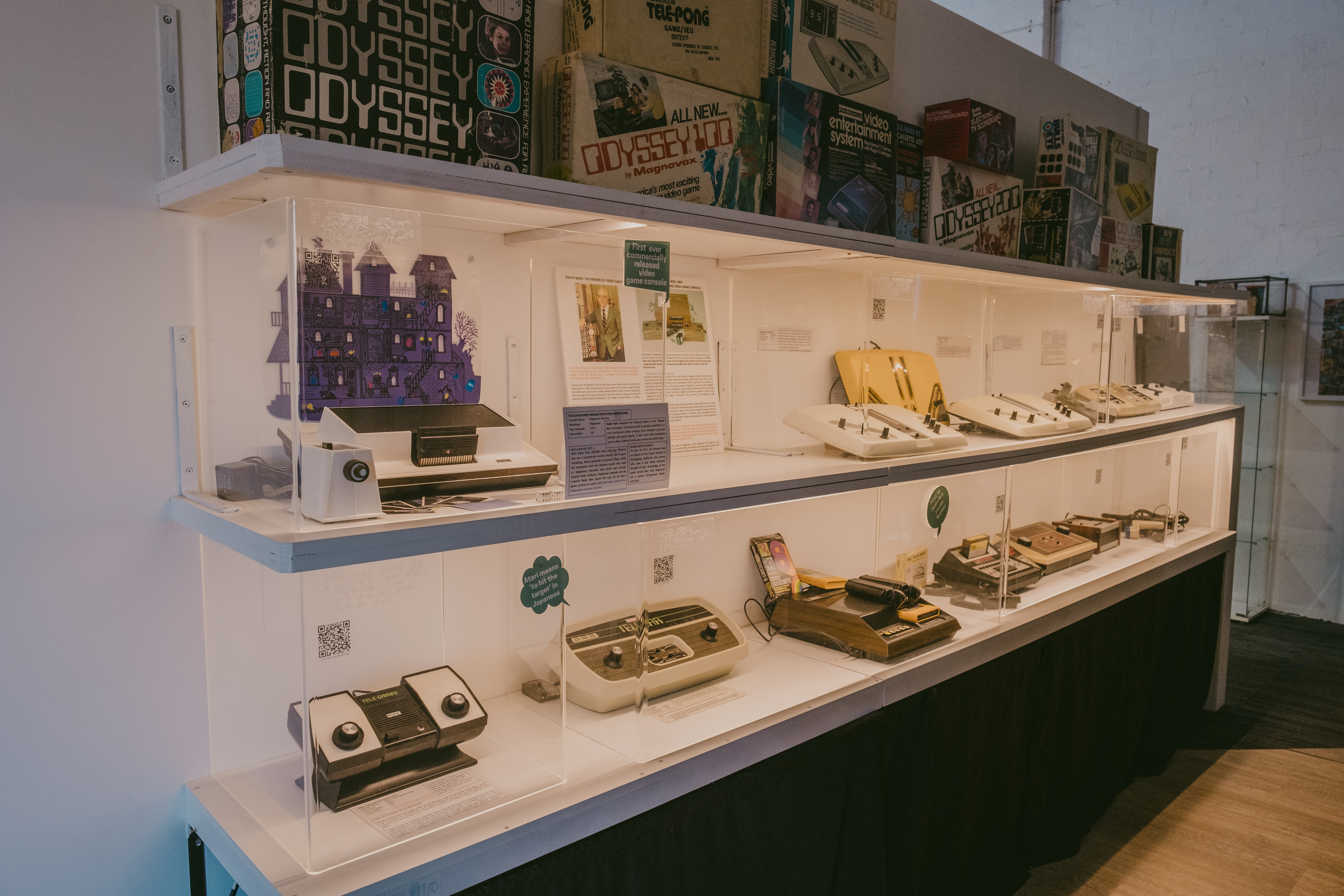
Console Museum Space- Entrance (West Perth Location)

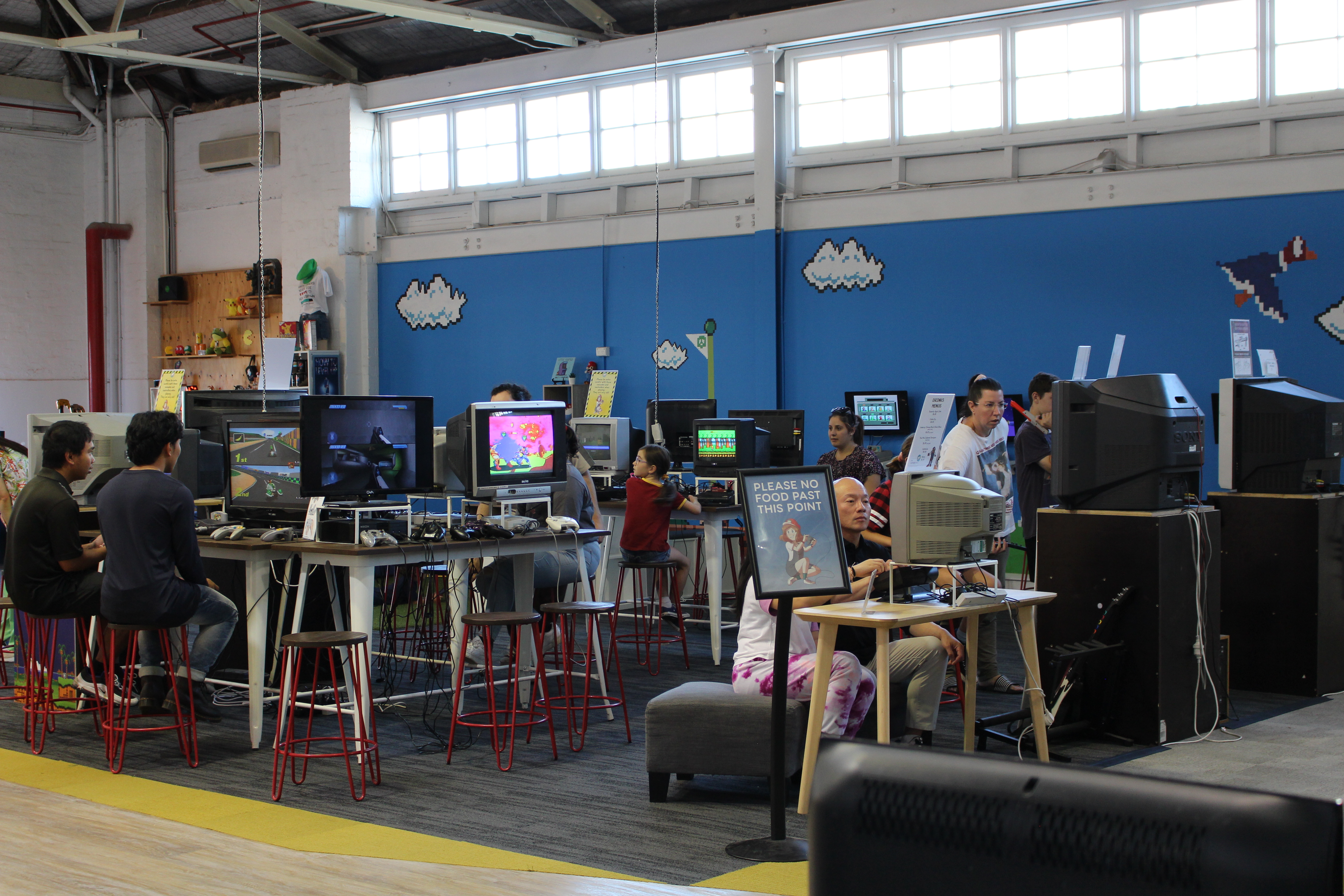
Arcade Space (West Perth Location)

== See also ==
- List of computer museums
- List of video game museums
