= Museum of Soviet Arcade Machines =

Museum in Moscow, Russia

Museum of Soviet Arcade Machines in Moscow
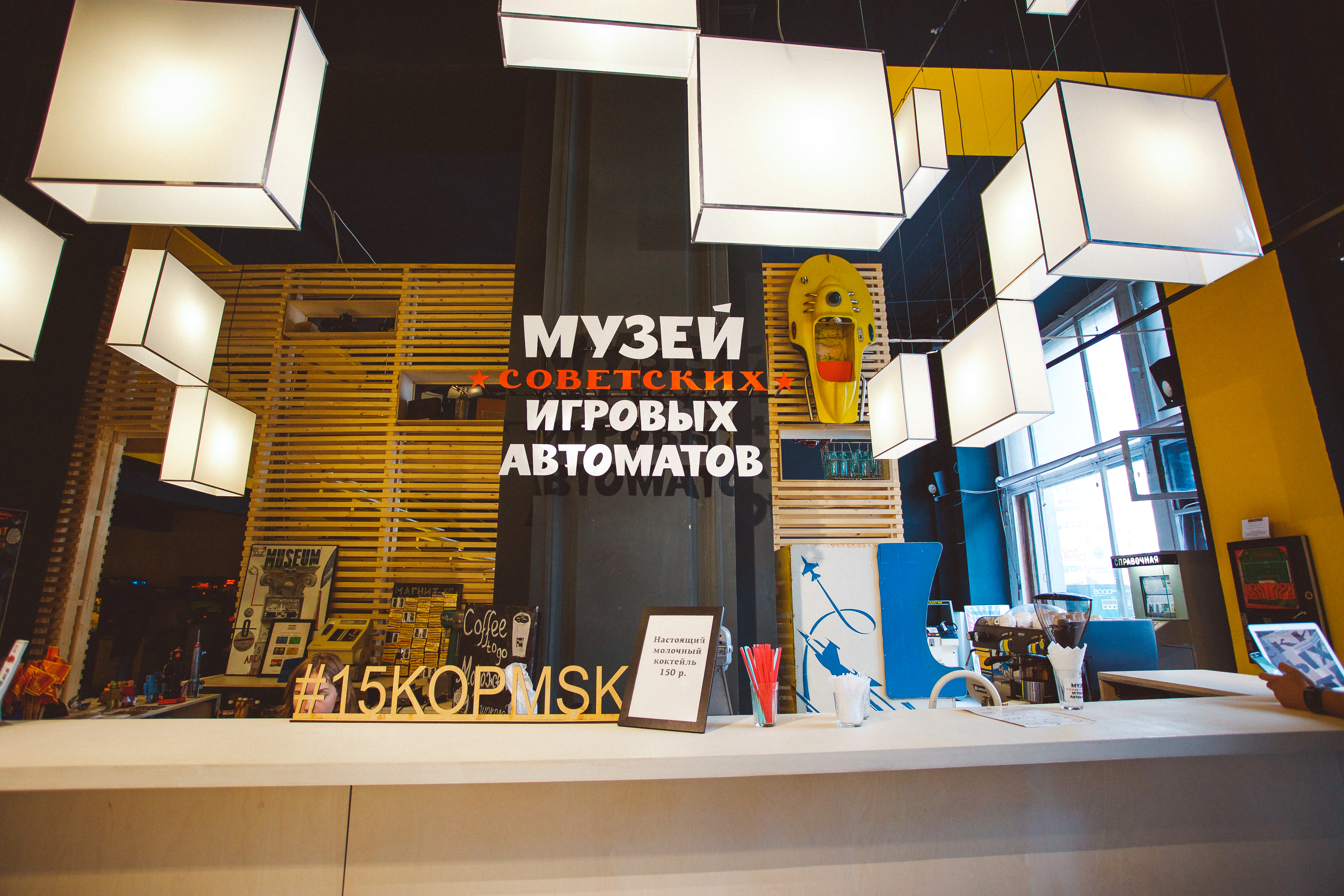

- Location within Central Moscow
- Established: 2007
- Location: Moscow, Kuznetsky Most, 12
- Coordinates: 55.761609°N 37.621121°E
- Website: www.15kop.ru/en/

Museum of Soviet Arcade Machines in St. Petersburg
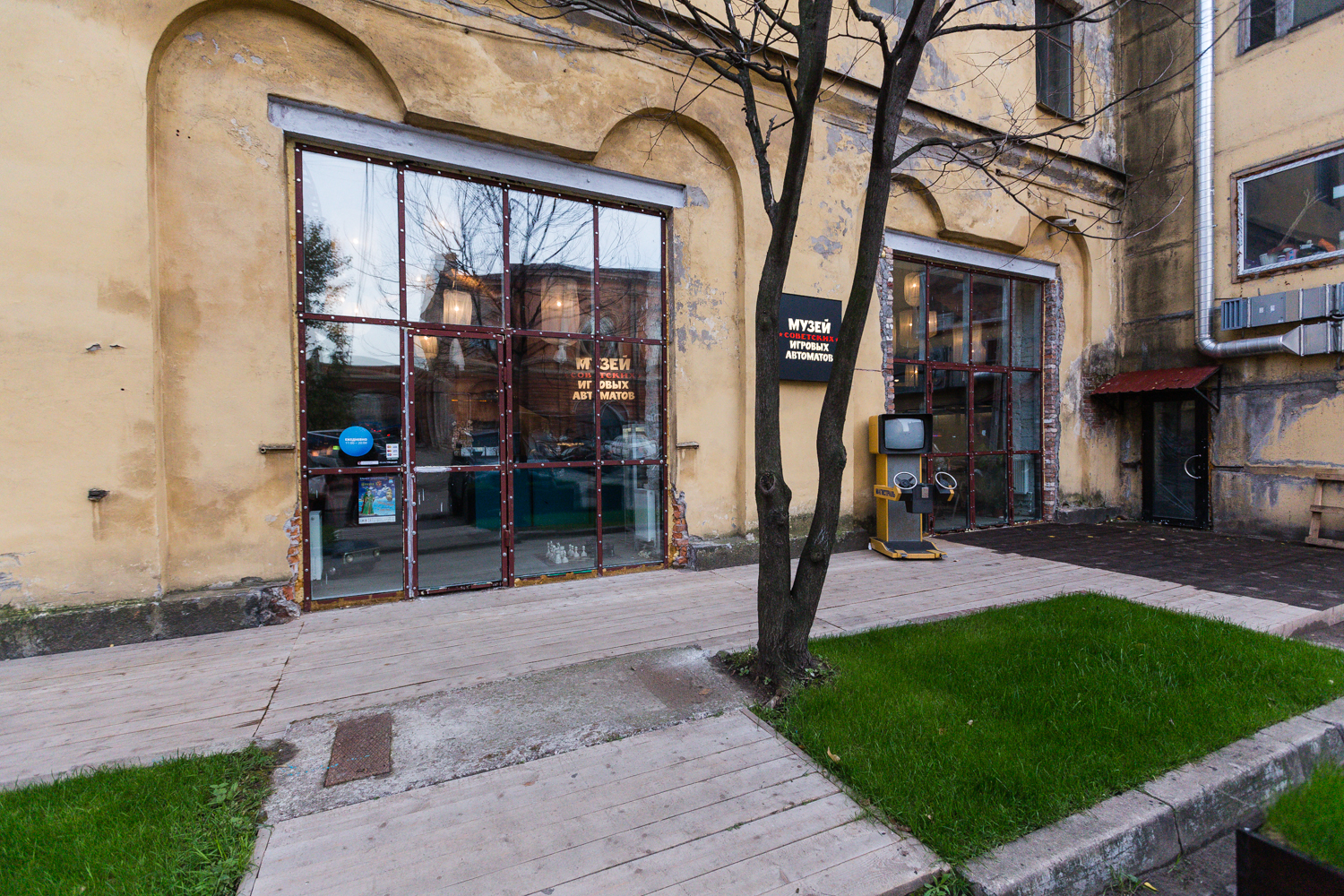

- Location within Central Saint Petersburg
- Established: 2013
- Location: St. Petersburg, Konyushennaya Square, 2B
- Coordinates: 59.940154°N 30.326073°E
- Website: www.15kop.ru/en/

The Museum of Soviet Arcade Machines (Russian: Музей советских игровых автоматов) is a private historical interactive museum that keeps a collection of arcade machines that were produced in the USSR from the mid-1970s. April 13, 2007 is considered to be the foundation day of the museum. Visitors of the museum are given 15-kopeck coins at the entrance to get the arcade machines started. The ticket price also includes an excursion.

== History of the museum ==
The museum was founded in 2007 by graduates of the Moscow Polytechnic University Alexander Stakhanov, Alexander Vugman and Maxim Pinigin and was located in the basement-bomb shelter of the university dormitory. At that time, the museum's collection included 37 arcade machines. It was possible to visit the museum only on Wednesdays and by prior arrangement.

It all started when we wanted to have the "Sea Battle" arcade machine at home, and we realized that it was interesting not only for us, but also for our friends.

— Alexander Stakhanov

The founders of the museum looked for the first arcade machines all over the country in landfills, abandoned pioneer camps, parks, cultural centers and cinemas. Several machines, which were the first in the collection, were bought for 210 rubles in the park of Pryamikov on Taganka. However, the dream of the "Sea Battle" was never realized, since the arcade machines were incomplete. Almost all the machines that came to the museum were not working, and one machine was assembled from three broken ones.

In April 2010, the museum moved to the building of the former workshop of the Rot Front factory in Malaya Ordynka. The museum started to work daily, and the collection expanded to 40 kinds of arcade machines.

In August 2011 the museum moved to Baumanskaya street, and the exposition was replenished with dozens of arcade machines.

A branch of the museum was opened on June 15, 2013 on Koniushennaya Square in St. Petersburg. It is located in a building that was used to store carriages in the 18th century. Garages, repair and production workshops of the Leningrad taxi fleet #1 were located on this territory during the Soviet times. The branch collection includes more than 50 working arcade machines. According to the museum, the number of visitors to the St. Petersburg branch in 2016 totalled 23 000 people, which is 9% more than in 2015.

At the end of August 2014, the third branch of the museum was opened in Kazan on the Kremlin street. About 40 arcade machines were presented there. The museum did not exist for a long time — on January 12, 2015 it was closed.

Since June 2015, the Moscow Museum of Soviet arcade machines is located on Kuznetsky Most Street. The museum's collection includes about 80 slot machines.

In April 2017, the museum turned 10 years old.

== Museum activity ==
Museums in St. Petersburg and Moscow regularly hold temporary exhibitions:

- 2015 — exhibition of chewing gum inserts "Currency of childhood";
- 2015 — exhibition of car models "Transport 1:43";
- 2016 — exhibition of posters "Evolution of arcade machines in the advertising graphics. Arcade machines in the context of art design";
- 2016 — the exhibition "Koniok-Gorbunok";
- 2017 — an exhibition of Soviet Christmas tree toys of the 1930-1990s "On a Christmas tree".

The daughter project of the founders of the Museum of Soviet slot machines is the Museum of Computer Games, created in 2014, which still exists in the format of a temporary exhibition. At the heart of the collection are more than 30 original gaming devices of eight generations, most of which are working. The collection is replenished with new game consoles. The collection was exhibited at VDNHh, in the loft project "Etazhi", in the halls of the St. Petersburg branch of the museum.

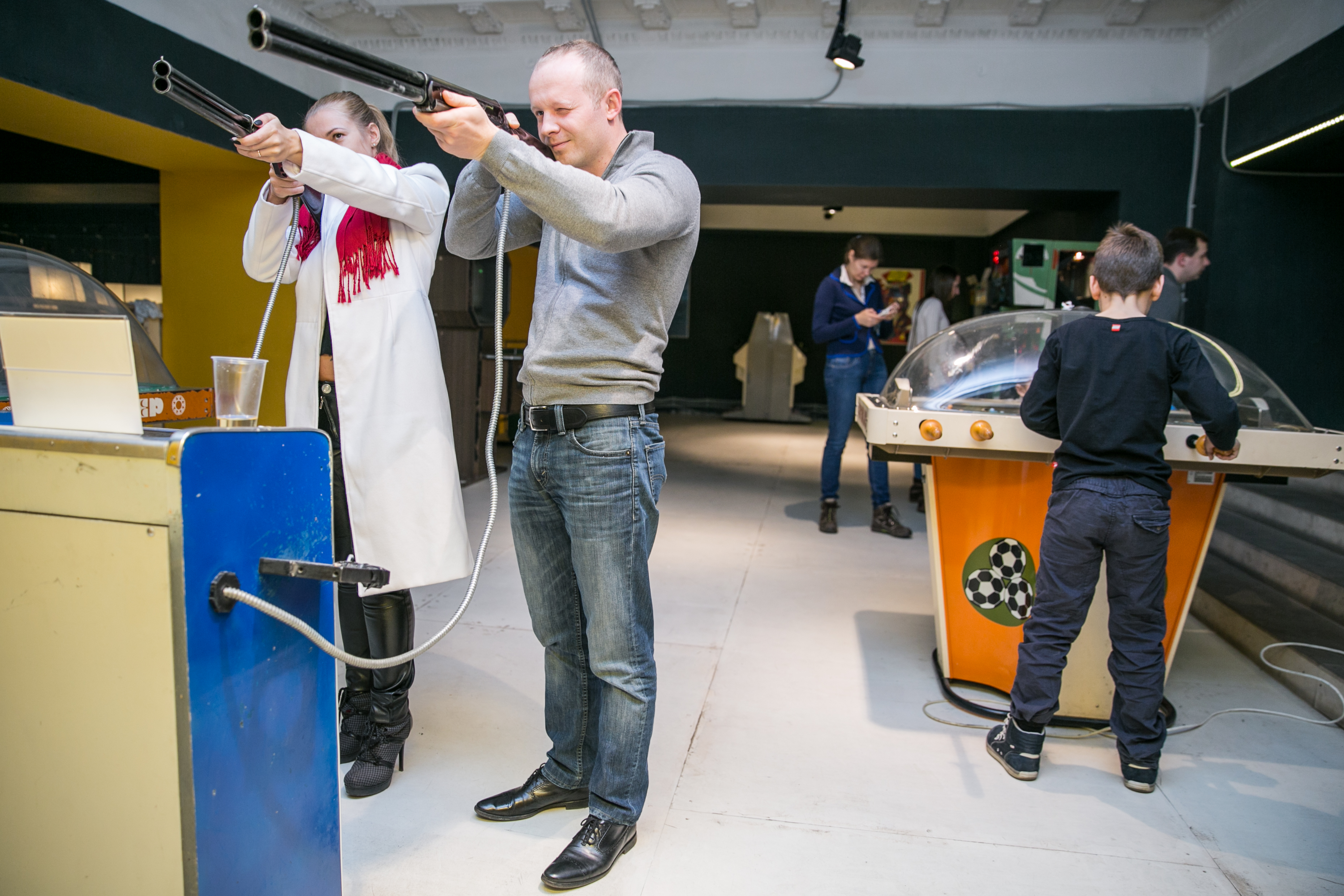
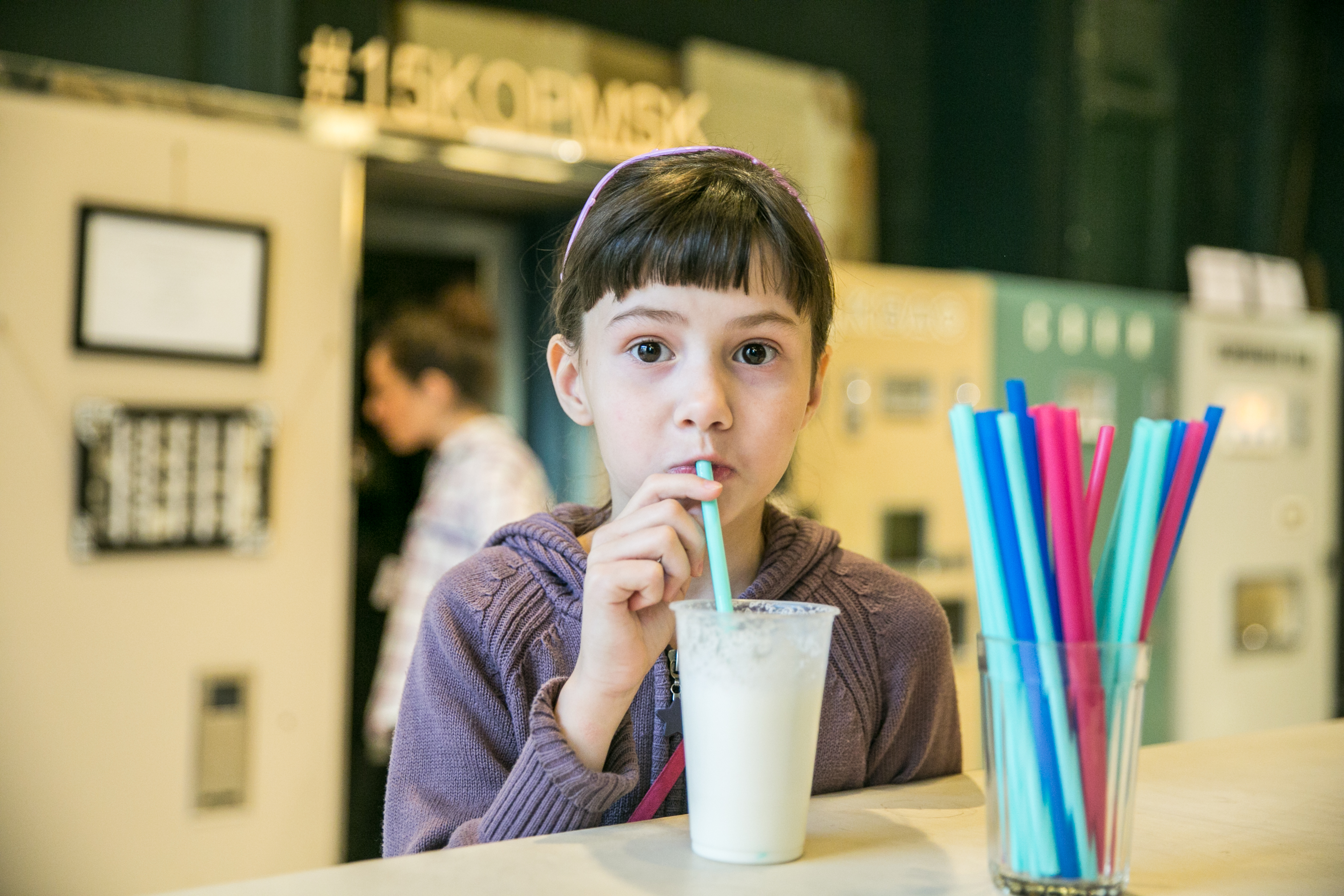
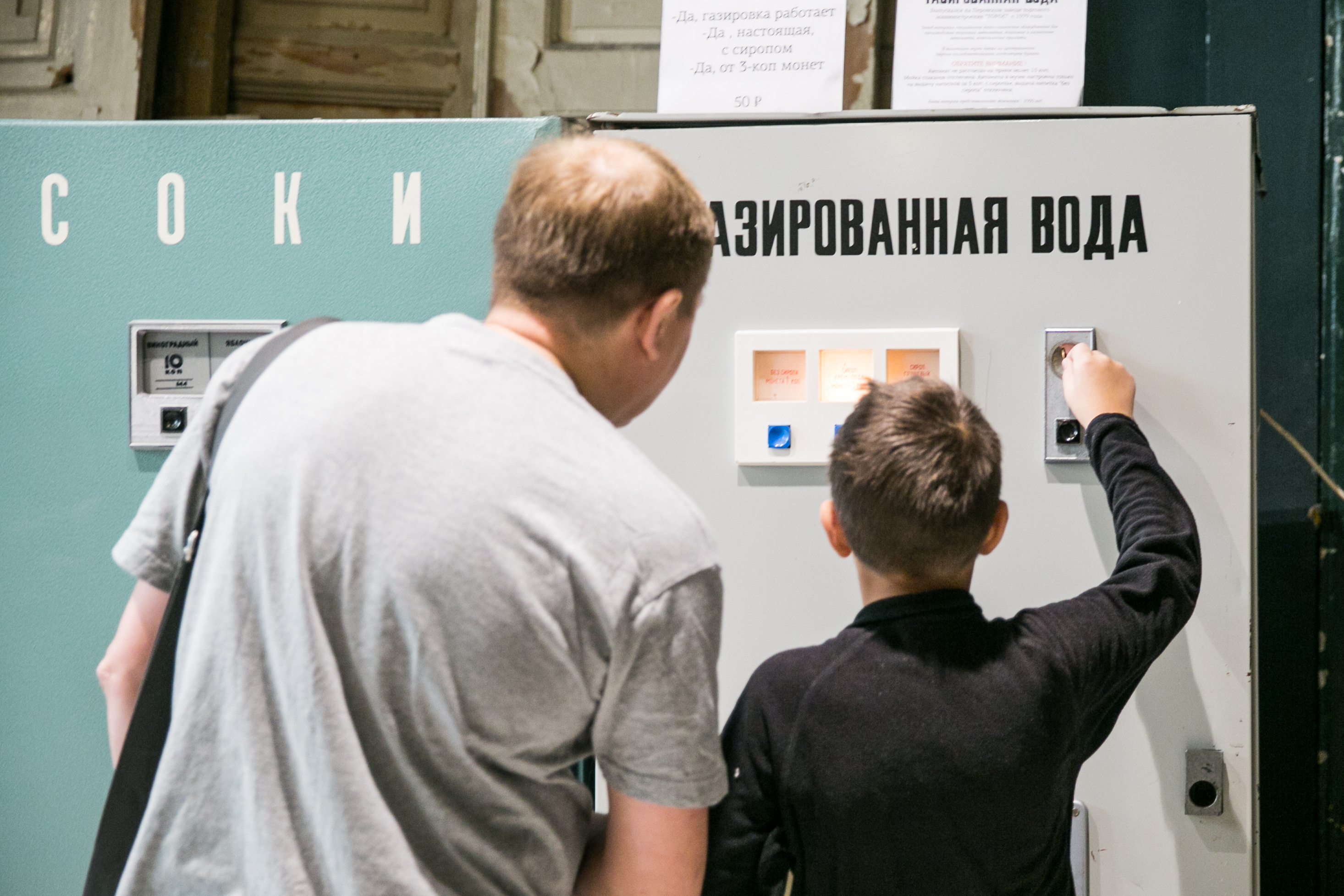
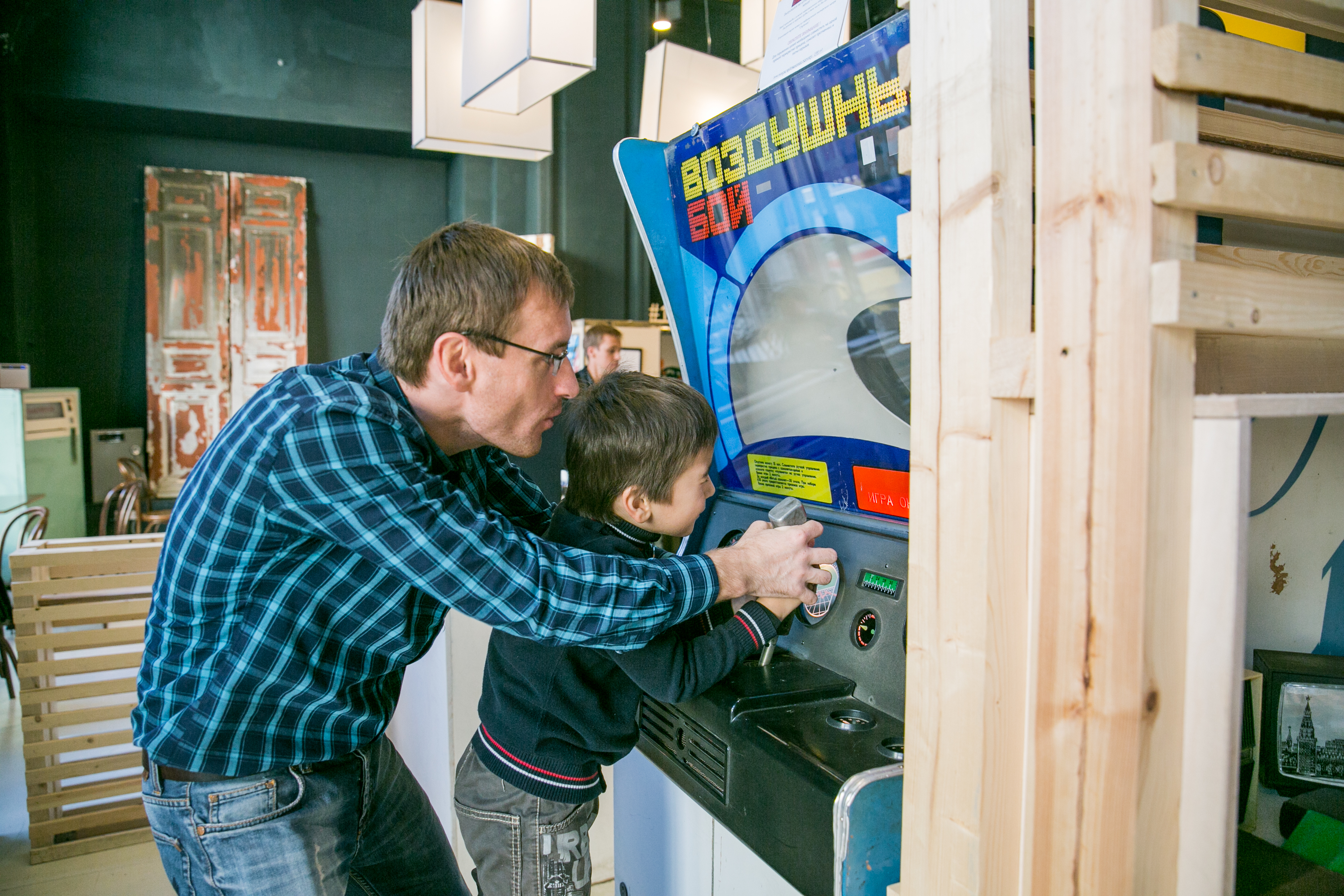
Moscow museum

Museums participate in city projects: they create programs for the annual children's festivals "Museums, Parks, Manors" and "Family Travel" in Moscow, "Children's Days in St. Petersburg" and "Big Regatta" in St. Petersburg; Take part in the actions "Night of Museums", "Night of Arts", "Restaurant Day", social project "Uppsala-Circus", in the international festival of museums "Intermuseum". Museum exhibits were presented at the festivals "VKontakte", Geek Picnic, "Disco 90", "Retro FM".

In addition, exhibitions of old filmstrips, lectures, table tennis tournaments, checkers, chess, master classes and other events are regularly held in Moscow and St. Petersburg branches.

== Collection ==
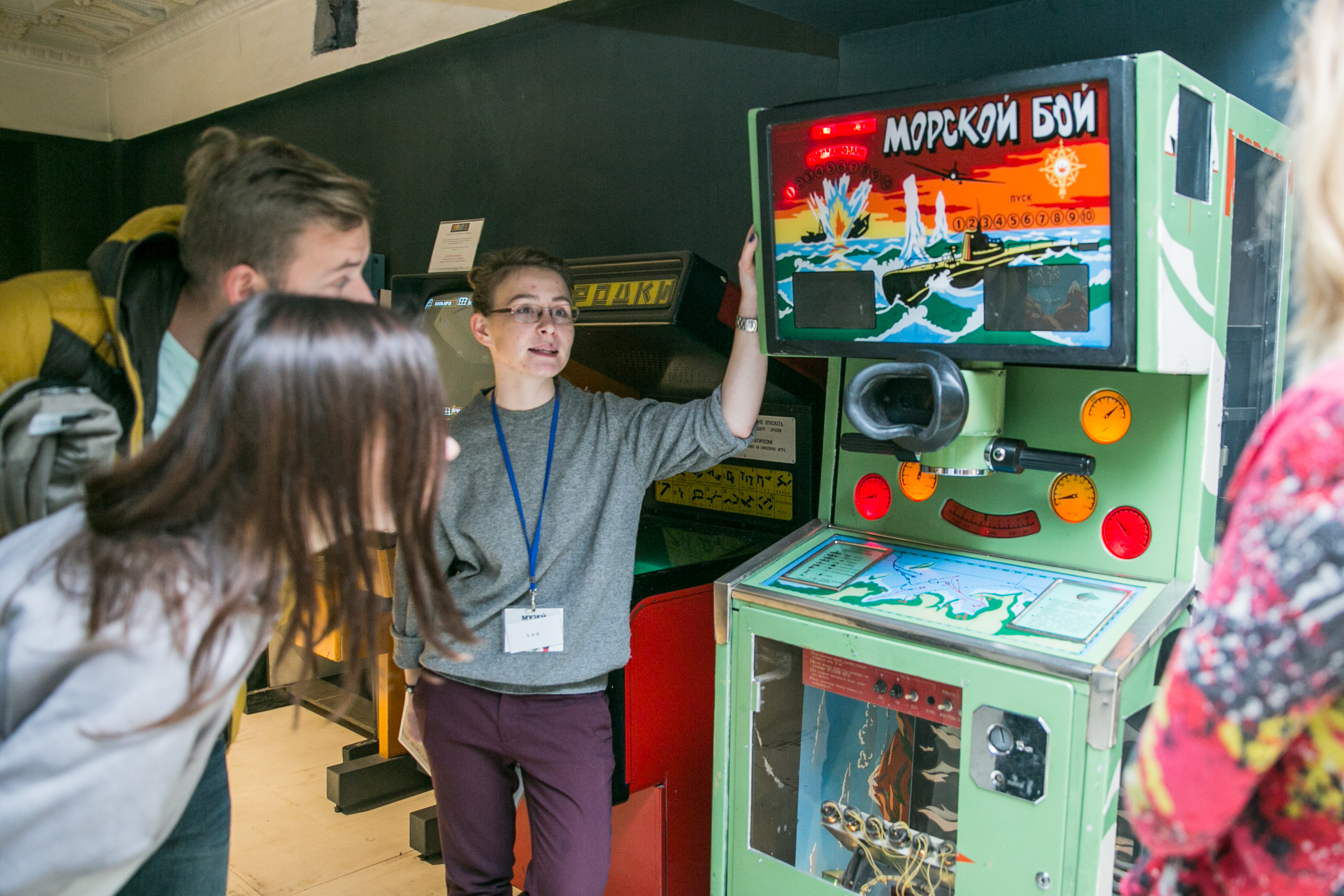
A guide in the Moscow Museum of Soviet arcade machines next to the "Sea Battle"

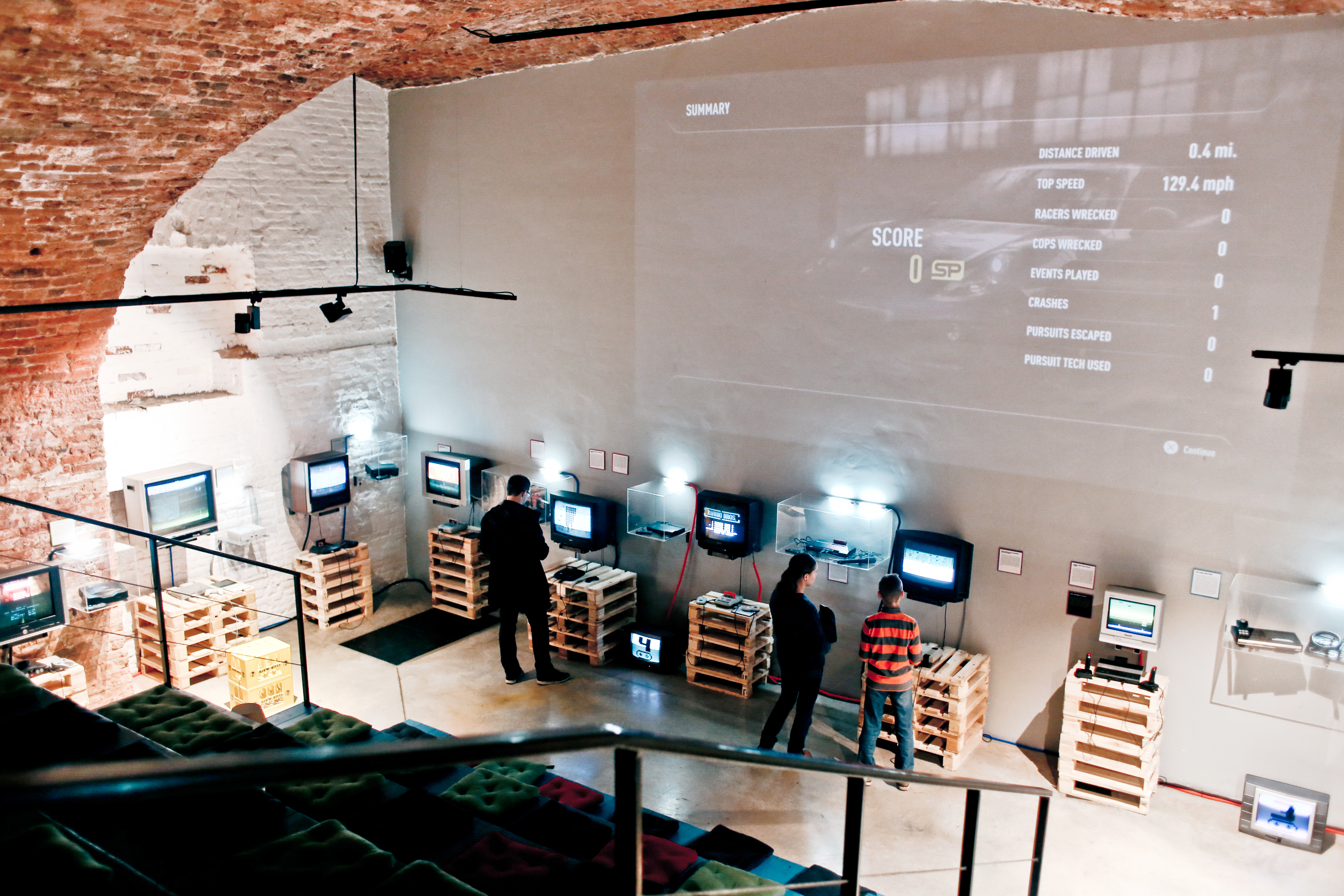
The exposition "Museum of computer games" in the Museum of Soviet arcade machines in St. Petersburg

The first foreign arcade machines were presented in 1971 at the World Amusement and Gaming Exhibition "Attraction-71", which took place in Gorky Park. Soviet samples appeared several years later, when the Ministry of Culture of the USSR commissioned the creation and production to the Union SoyuzAttraction, which distributed orders between 22 classified defense factories. For example, the arcade machine "Sea Battle" was manufactured by the Serpukhov Radio Engineering Plant.

In the production of arcade machines the most modern microcircuits, alloys, and plastic were used, and the design engineers of the plant were engaged in the design of games and arcade machines. However, this was an irrational production: engineers assembled copies of foreign slot machines basing on available parts, which often were not suitable for these needs. Instead of using one modern processor, engineers had to assemble a complex circuit that could replace it. A special department at the SoyuzAttraction was responsible for adaptation of foreign gaming machines to the Soviet ideology. The subjects and characters of arcade - aliens and cowboys were replaced by heroes of Russian folk tales. The arcade machines had to give young people an idea of future professions, for example, a taxi driver.

In total, about 90 types of arcade machines were produced in the USSR, some of which were an exact copy of the western ones, but many of them appeared in the Soviet Union — for example, the machine "Gorodki".

In the first years of the amusement industry, all arcade machines were owned by SoyuzAttraction, which had a financial plan for the day of work, which gave rise to the corruption. In the early 80s a different structure appeared instead of this association and dealt only with the manufacture of arcade machines and their sale. After the collapse of the USSR, the production of arcade machines stopped.

Today the exposition of each museum branch has more than 50 arcade machines. There are "Sea Battle", "Gorodki", "Snaiper-2", "Highway", "Rally", "The Giant Turnip", "Basketball", "Football", "Safari", "Winter Hunt", "Quiz", "Buttle-planes", "Horse Racing", "Submarine", "Tank-training area", "Doublet", "Probe", "Billiards", "Snow Queen", "Circus" (which is the only known Soviet pinball machine), "TV-sports", "Overtake", "Virage", "Crane", "Lucky shot" and many others among them.

In addition to arcade machines, the museum also features an automaton with sparkling water, "Reference", automatic coin exchange machines, a Soviet mixer "Voronezh". The oldest arcade machine in the museum is the "Battle of the Sea" made in 1979.

Almost all machines accept 15-copeck coins. The coin-receiver first checks the dimensions of the dropped coin, and then, by inertia, flips it. It allows to sort out coins made of other metal — they have different mass and speed.

== Awards ==
- 2016 — Best organization in the field of interactive youth leisure;
- 2017 — Best specialized museum;
- 2017 — Winner of the All-Russian Festival of Museum Multimedia "Museum GIK" in the nomination "Games and quizzes".
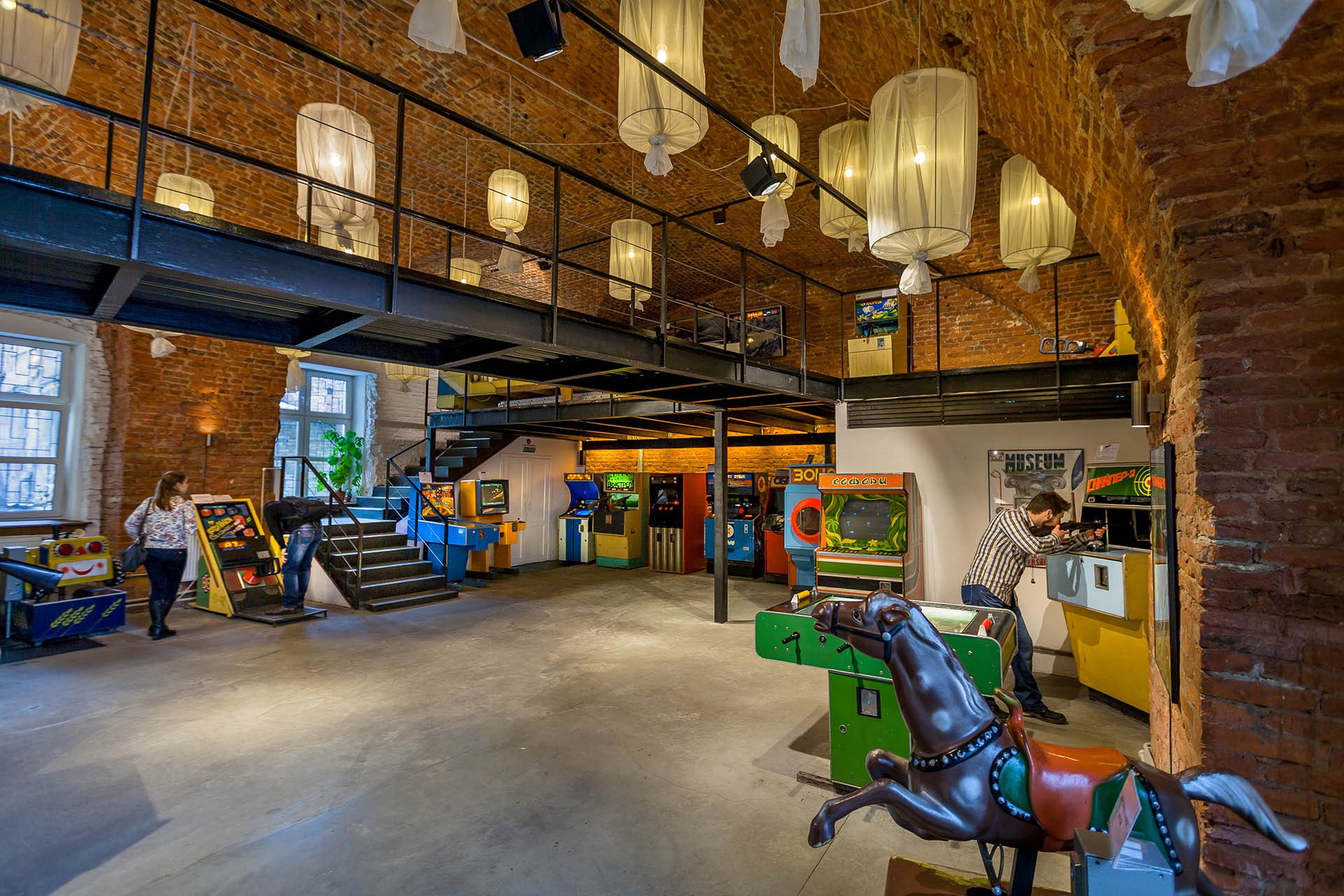
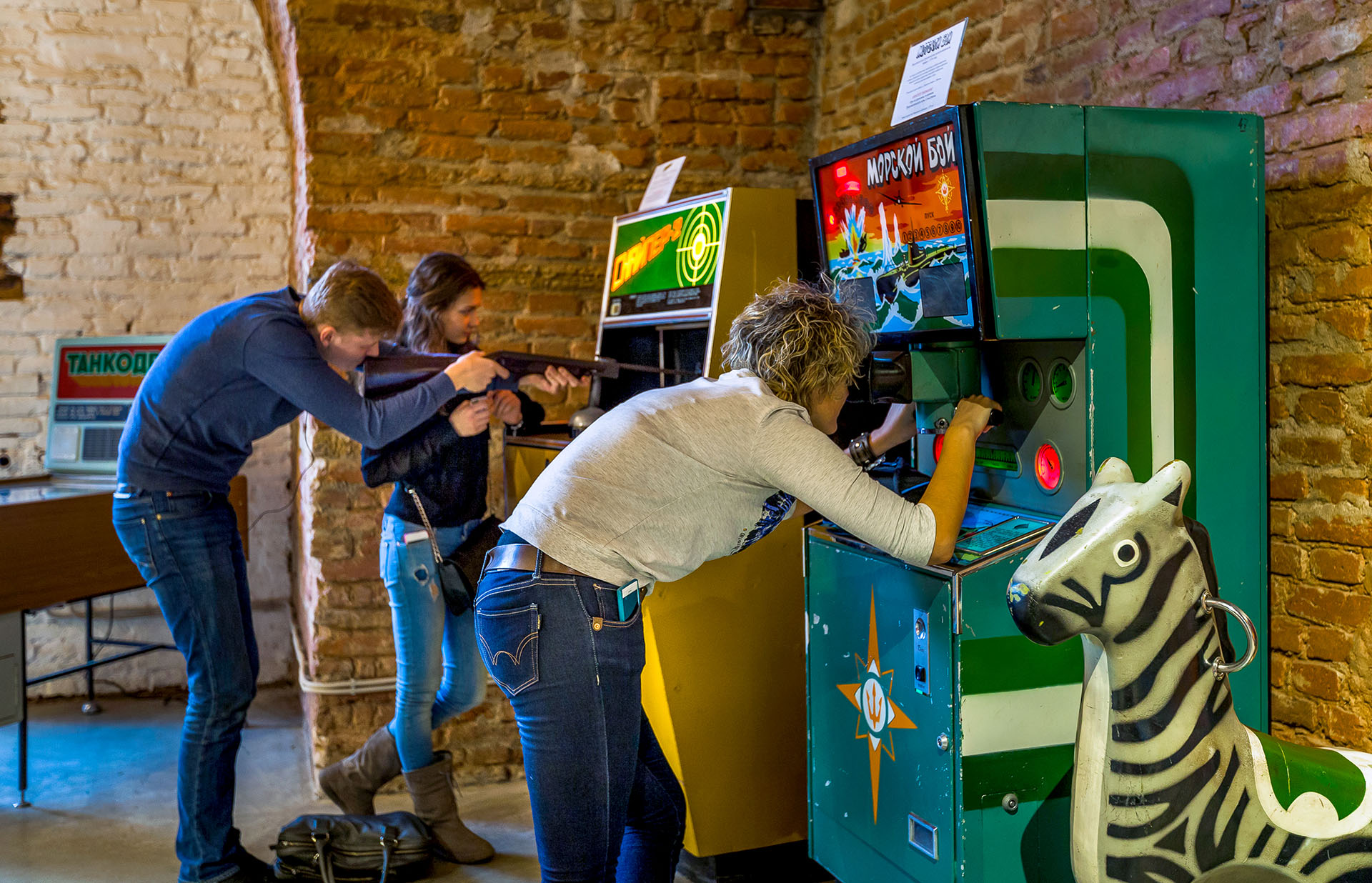
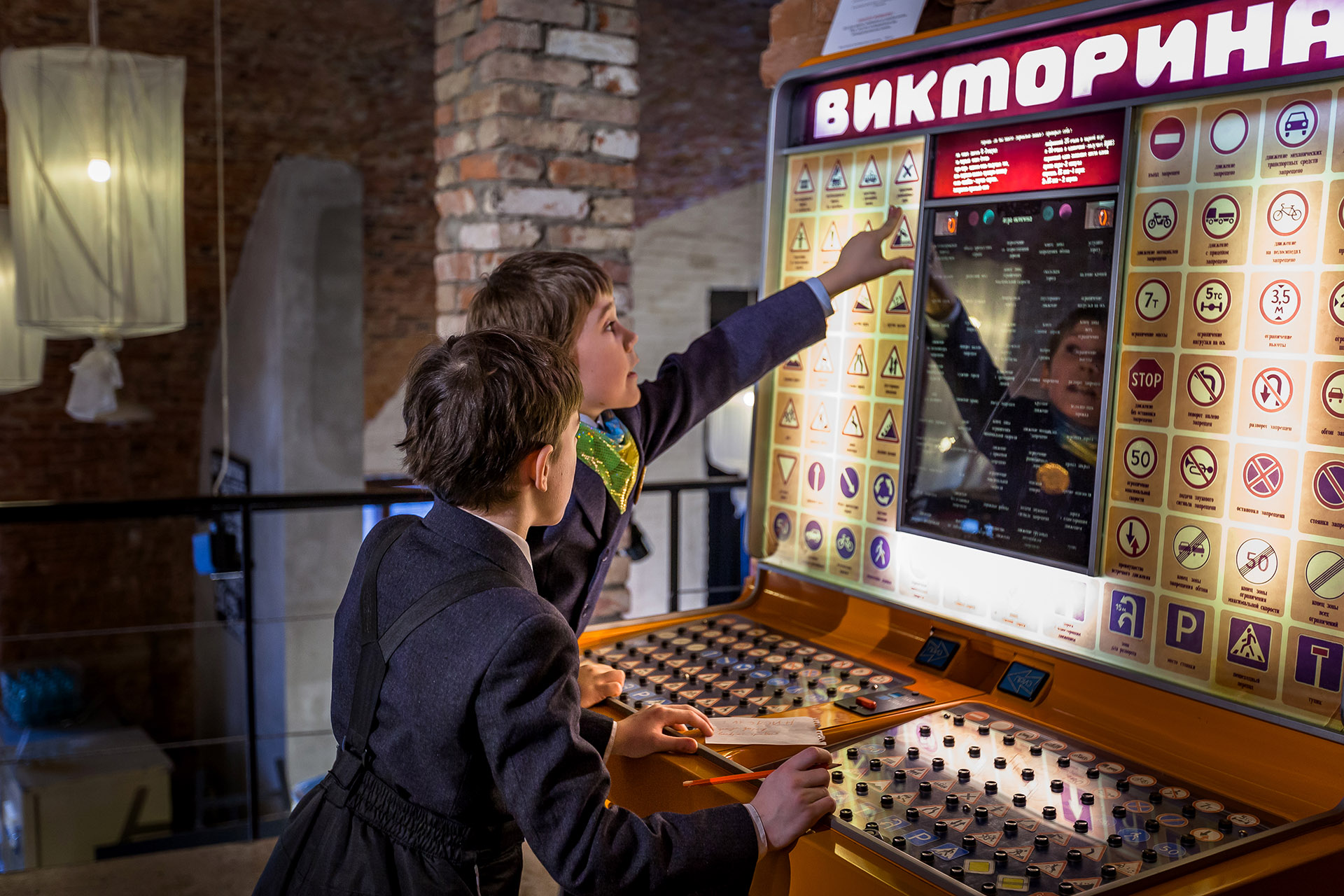
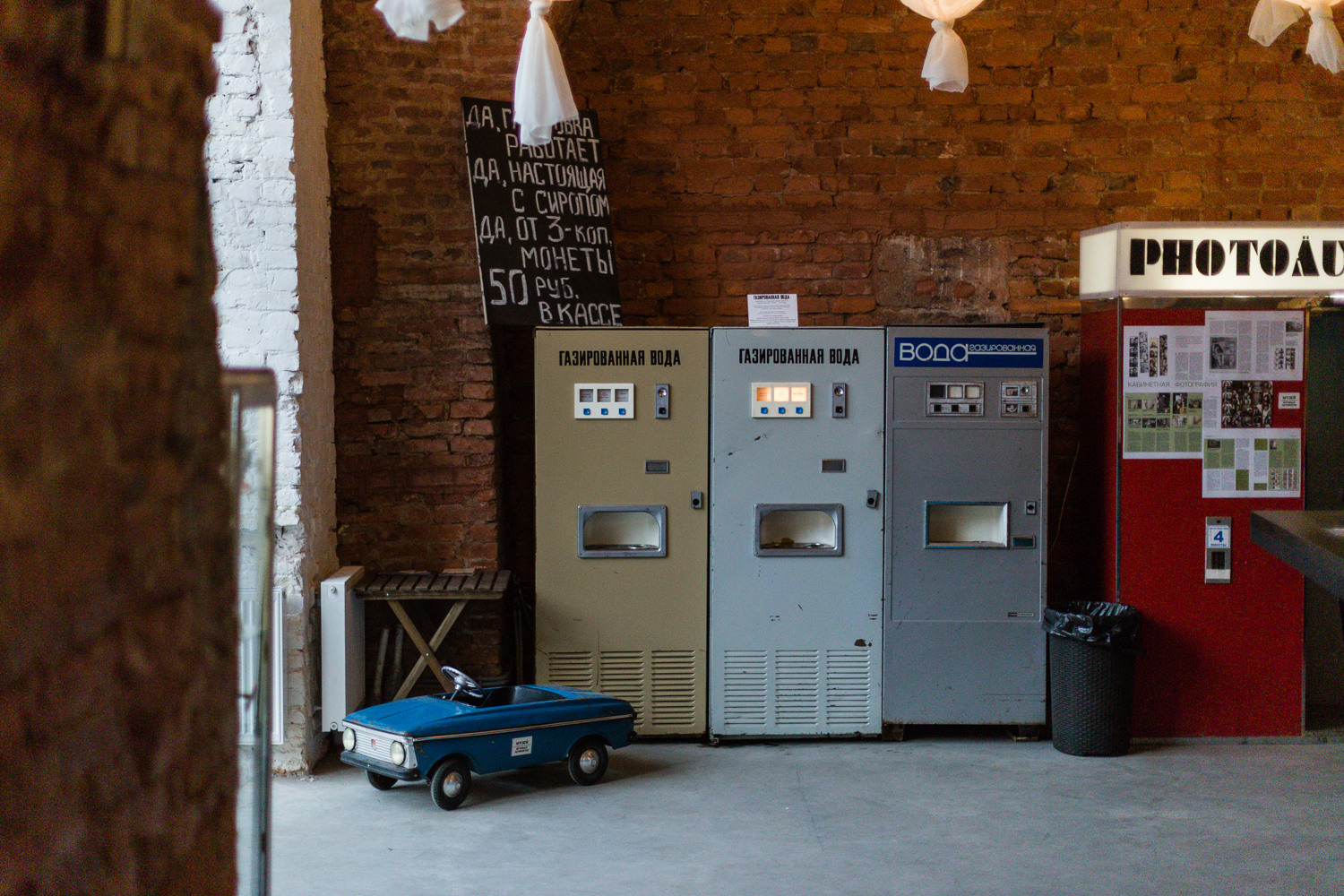
Museum in Saint Petersburg
