= The Gamesmen =

The Gamesmen Pty Ltd
- Trade name: The Gamesmen
- Type: Private
- Industry: Retail video games
- Founded: 1982
- Founder: Angelo Cusumano Snr
- Headquarters: 491 Forest Road, Penshurst, New South Wales, AUS
- Owner: Mary Cusumano
- Website: www.gamesmen.com.au

The Gamesmen is an Australian video game, table top games and toy retailer based in Penshurst, New South Wales. It was founded in 1982.

== Retro Video Game Museum ==
The Retro Video Game Museum is a small permanent display area inside The Gamesmen, and features retro game consoles, other hardware, games and store displays.

== History ==
Originally known as 'The Gamesman' (not to be confused with the New Zealand retailer of the same name), The Gamesmen began when founder Angelo Cusumano started selling video games at local markets around Sydney, Australia, and eventually at the Sydney Royal Easter Show. Its first retail store was located on Bonds Road, Riverwood before moving to its current location on Forest Road in Penshurst, New South Wales.

In 1990, the Gamesmen started producing physical catalogues for mail order customers, and in 2017 published a digital archive on their website of all their old catalogues.

Its founder, Angelo Cusumano Sr., died after being shot during a robbery attempt at the store on 21 December 1995.

The Gamesmen was the first Australian retailer to sell video games online, launching their website on 18 July 1996. On September 2, 2022, The Gamesmen celebrated its 40th birthday.
