= National Videogame Museum (United States) =

Video game museum

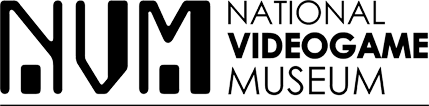

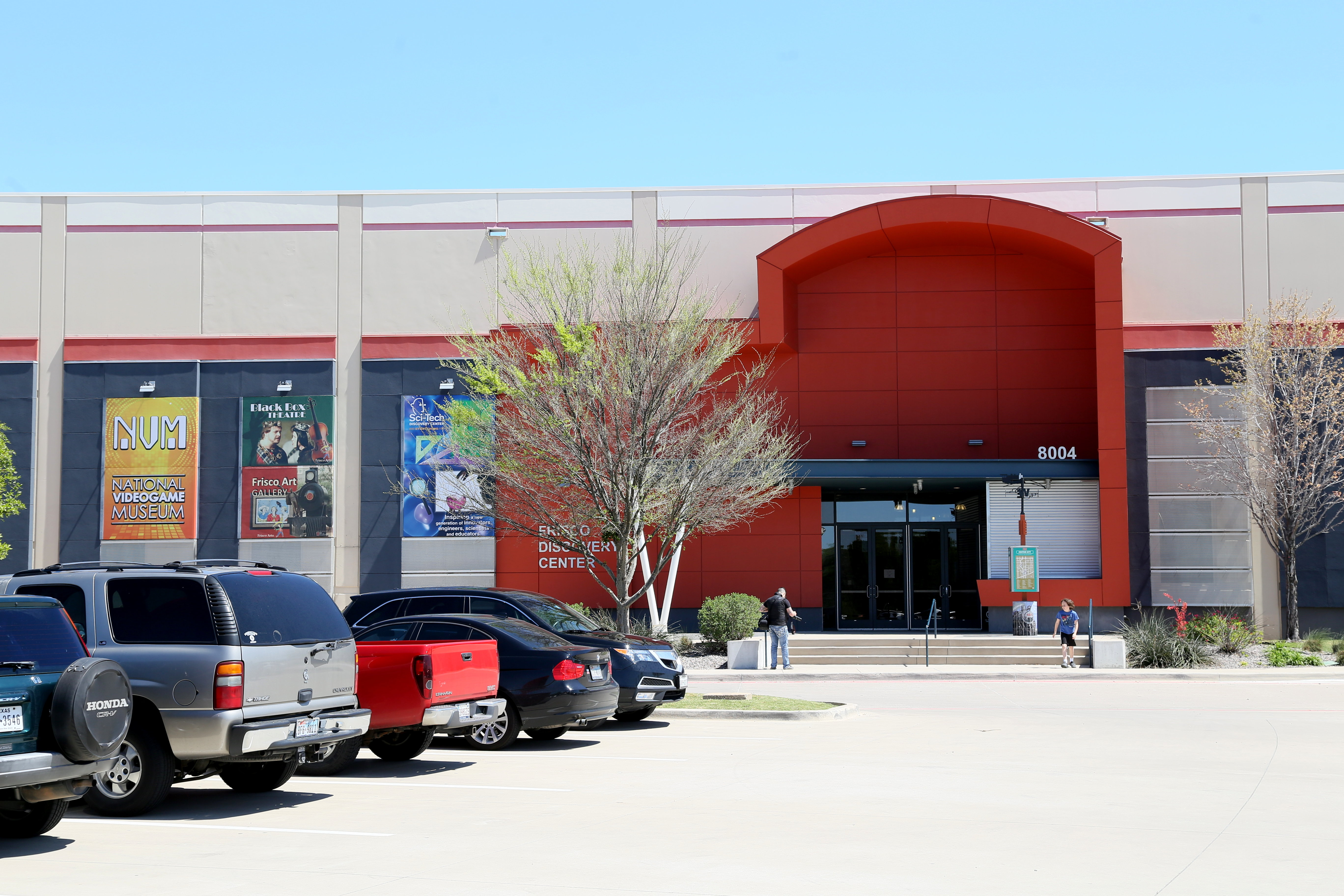
- Exterior in April, 2016
- Established: April 2, 2016
- Location: Frisco, Texas, United States
- Coordinates: 33.143998°N 96.835238°W
- Type: Computer museum
- Founders: John Hardie; Sean Kelly; Joe Santulli
- Website: nvmusa.org

The National Videogame Museum is a video game museum about the history of video games and the video game industry, located in Frisco, Texas. Opened in 2016, the museum includes classic video game arcade machines in an arcade setting, games on different video game consoles in a living room setting, games on historic computers, exhibits on the history of the industry, artifacts and memorabilia about the video game industry. One of the museum's goals is to have visitors experience the games, so there are many interactive displays which feature playable games.

== History ==
Beginning in 1999, John Hardie, Sean Kelly and Joe Santulli hosted the first Classic Gaming Expo in Las Vegas to organize "the world's first event paying tribute to the people, systems and games of yesteryear". The Video Game Museum was a traveling exhibition of classic games and systems that was shown at the Expo, as well as displayed at such trade conventions as E3 (Electronic Entertainment Expo) and GDC (Game Developers Conference).

In 2011, the founders started a Kickstarter campaign in an effort to mobilize their archive as a first step towards finding a permanent location, to be known as the Videogame History Museum.

On September 18, 2014, the Frisco Community Development Corporation board voted unanimously to bring the Videogame History Museum to Frisco, Texas, although it was not their first choice. Their preferred location was Silicon Valley.

The 10,400-square-foot (970 m^{2}) National Videogame Museum opened in April 2016 in the Frisco Discovery Center.

== Features ==
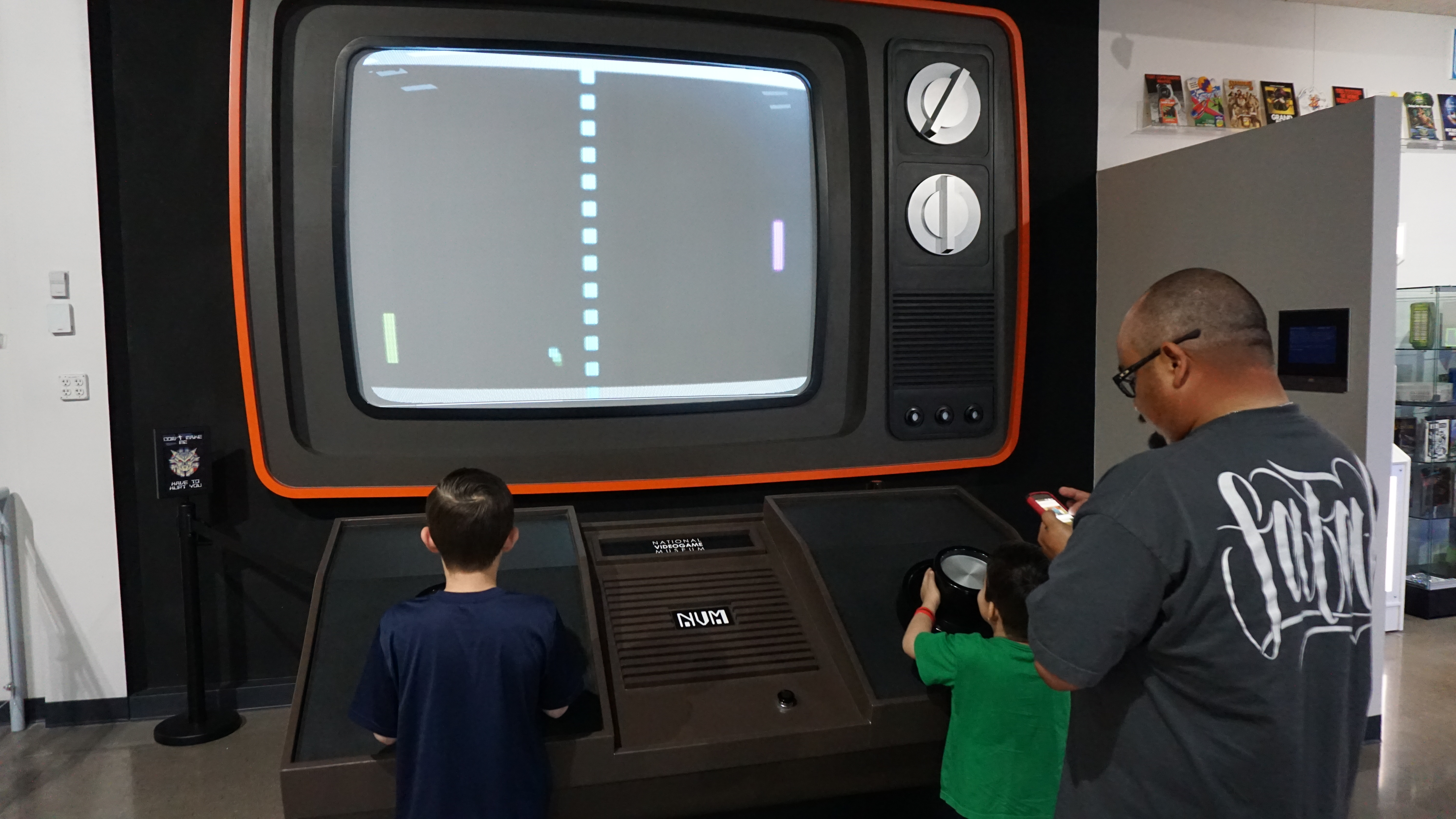
People playing a large scale version of the iconic Pong video game at the National Videogame Museum

The National Videogame Museum offers multiple exhibits that each focus on a different "stage" or aspect of video game history. This includes exhibits that focus on sound design in games, the video game crash of 1983, the rise of the home computer as well as the evolution of video game controllers, consoles, and more. The museum features elaborate showcases of particularly rare and popular gaming artifacts, such as Stadium Events and the Nintendo World Championships NES Cartridge, as well as rare special edition consoles, many of which had only a handful of units ever produced. The Museum also acts as a safe haven for all kinds of video game prototypes, including the only known prototype of the unreleased Sega Neptune ever created. The National Videogame Museum is notable for having one of the largest historical gaming archives in the world.

Various game consoles are running around the Museum that attendees can sit down with and play at their leisure, or go head-to-head with one another, with a selection of games that typically rotates monthly. The National Videogame Museum also hosts a fully featured, 80's style classic gaming arcade that features games such as Pac-Man, Punch-Out!!, Donkey Kong, and many other classic arcade mainstays. There is also a giant-sized version of the game Pong that has earned the museum widespread acclaim.
