= National Videogame Museum (The Netherlands) =

Museum in Zoetermeer, the Netherlands

- Nationaal Videogame Museum
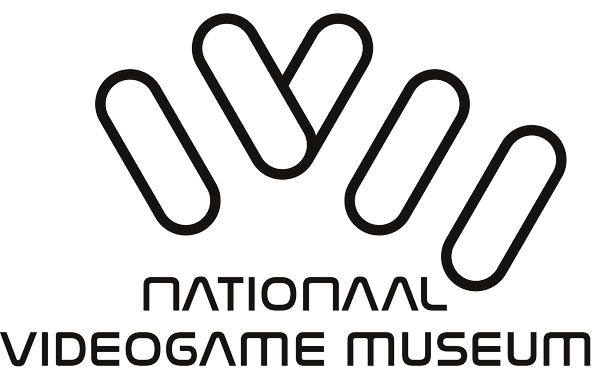
- Established: 2017
- Location: Zoetermeer
- Founder: Hasan Tasdemir
- Website: www.nationaalvideogamemuseum.nl

The National Videogame Museum (Dutch: Nationaal Videogame Museum) is a museum in Zoetermeer, The Netherlands. It offers a variety of games, ranging from retro games to modern arcade games. Although the museum is mainly an arcade experience, it uses their systems for educational purposes as well. This concept was not the first of its kind in The Netherlands; the Bonami Games & Computer Museum in Zwolle and retro arcade Awesome Space in Utrecht are predecessors of the National Videogame Museum. The museum opened in a building in Zoetermeer where Vroom & Dreesmann had been situated before. It was founded by Hasan Tasdemir in 2017.

== See also ==
- HomeComputerMuseum
