= List of computer museums =

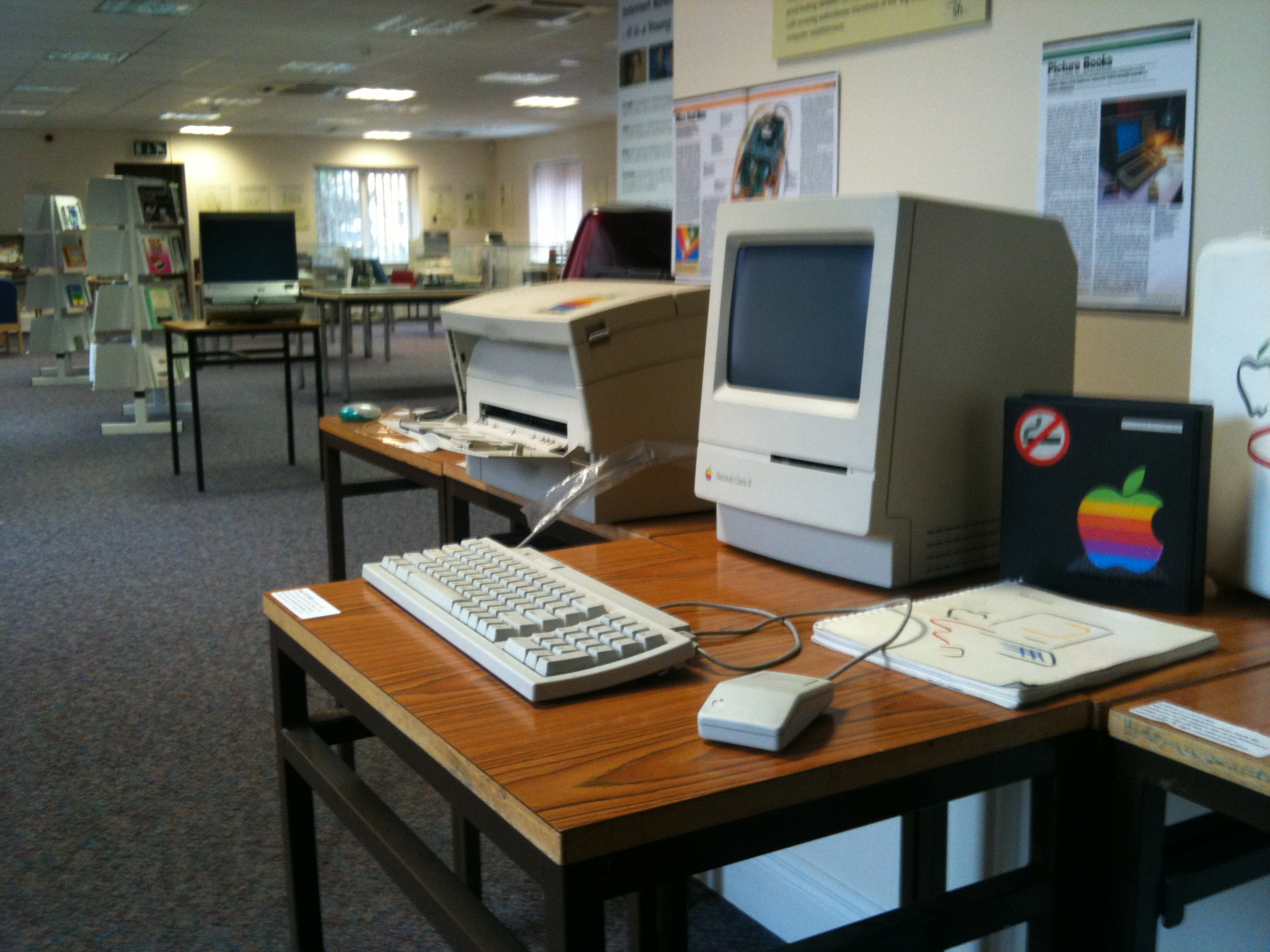
The National Computer & Communications Museum

A computer museum is devoted to the study of historic computer hardware and software, where a “museum” is a “permanent institution in the service of society and of its development, open to the public, which acquires, conserves, researches, communicates, and exhibits the tangible and intangible heritage of humanity and its environment, for the purposes of education, study, and enjoyment”, as defined by the International Council of Museums.

Some computer museums exist within larger institutions, such as the Science Museum in London, United Kingdom; and the Deutsches Museum in Munich, Germany. Others are dedicated specifically to computing, such as:

- the Computer History Museum in Mountain View, California, United States.
- the American Computer & Robotics Museum in Bozeman, Montana, United States.
- the Heinz Nixdorf Forum (HNF) in Paderborn, Germany.
- The National Museum of Computing at Bletchley Park, United Kingdom.
- The Centre for Computing History in Cambridge, United Kingdom
- the Nexon Computer Museum in Jeju Province. South Korea.

Some specialize in the early history of computing, others in the era that started with the first personal computers such as the Apple I and Altair 8800, Apple II systems, older Mac models, Amiga, IBM PCs and rarer computers such as the Osborne 1. Some concentrate more on research and conservation, others more on education and entertainment. There are also private collections, most of which can be visited by appointment.

== Asia ==
=== Israel ===
- The Israeli Personal Computer Museum, Haifa

=== Japan ===
- IPSJ Computer Museum - A virtual museum by IPSJ, an academic society of information processing in Japan, and affiliated physical computer museums ("satellite museums") all over Japan, such as:
  - KCG Computer Museum, Kyoto - a computer museum by KCG, an education institution
  - Microcomputer Museum in Ōme,_Tokyo
- Tokyo University of Science Museum of Science's "History of the Computer"

=== South Korea ===
- Nexon Computer Museum

== Oceania ==
=== Australia ===
- The Australian Computer Museum Society, Inc, NSW - very large collection
- The Nostalgia Box, Perth - Video Game Museum
- Powerhouse Museum - Has Computer Exhibit
- Monash Museum of Computing History, Monash University

=== New Zealand ===
- Techvana, Auckland

== Europe ==
=== Belgium ===
- Computermuseum NAM-IP, Namur
- Unisys Computermuseum, Haren (Brussels)

=== Croatia ===
- Peek&Poke, Rijeka

=== Czech Republic ===
- Technical museum in Brno - Computer Technology
- Retro Computer, Žatec
- Muzeum počítačové techniky, Higher Education College Žďár nad Sázavou
- Arcade Hry, Červený Újezd (arcade video games)
- Game World, Prague (arcade video games)

=== Denmark ===
- Dansk Datahistorisk Forening, Hedehusene

=== Estonia ===
- Arvutimuuseum, Tallinn
- Side ja Laptopi muuseum, Võrumaa, Rõuge vald, Mustahamba küla

=== Finland ===
- Rupriikki Media Museum, Tampere
- Finnish Museum of Games, Tampere
- The Computer Shop 1984 build by The Computer Museum of Kallio, Helsinki

=== France ===
- ACONIT, Grenoble
- MO5, Paris
- FEB, Angers
- Musée des Arts et Métiers, Paris
- Musée de l'imprimerie, Lyon
- AMISA : Association pour un Musée de l'informatique, Sophia Antipolis
- INRIA : Institut national de recherche en Informatique et Automatique, Montbonnot-Saint-Martin
- Silicium, Toulouse

=== Germany ===
- Computerspielemuseum Berlin, Berlin - Video Game Museum
- Arithmeum, Bonn - Comprehensive collection of historical calculating machines
- BINARIUM, Dortmund - Video Game and Personal Computer Museum
- Heinz Nixdorf MuseumsForum, Paderborn
- Computermuseum der Fakultät Informatik, University of Stuttgart
- Oldenburger Computer-Museum, Oldenburg
- Computeum, Vilshofen, with a selection from the Munich Computer Warehouse, Private Collection
- Deutsches Museum, Munich - Large computer collection in their Communications exhibit
- technikum29 living museum, Frankfurt - Re-opened in January 2020.
- Computerarchiv Muenchen, Munich - Computer, Video Games and Magazine Archive
- Computermuseum der Fachhochschule Kiel, Kiel
- de:Analog Computer Museum, Bad Schwalbach / Hettenhain - Large collection of analog computers, working and under restoration.

=== Greece ===
- Hellenic IT Museum, in Athens

=== Ireland ===
- Computer and Communications Museum of Ireland, National University of Ireland

=== Italy ===
- Museo dell'Informatica Funzionante, Palazzolo Acreide (Siracusa)
- Museo del Computer, via per Occhieppo, 29, 13891 Camburzano (Biella)
- Museo Interattivo di Archeologia Informatica, Cosenza
- UNESCO Computer Museum, Padua
- All About Apple Museum, Savona
- Piedmontese Museum of Informatics, Turin
- VIGAMUS, Rome - Video Game Museum
- Tecnologic@mente, Ivrea
- Museum of Computing Machinery, Pisa
- IMuC - Computer Museum Messina, Messina

=== Lithuania ===
- Retrobytes cafe - vintage computers gallery, Kaunas

=== The Netherlands ===
- The Apple Museum, Utrecht
- Bonami SpelComputer Museum, Zwolle
- Computer Museum Universiteit van Amsterdam, Amsterdam
- Computermuseum Hack42, Arnhem
- HomeComputerMuseum, Helmond
- Rotterdams Radio Museum, Rotterdam

=== Poland ===
- Muzeum Historii Komputerów i Informatyki, Katowice
- Muzeum Gry i Komputery Minionej Ery (Muzeum Gier), Wrocław
- Apple Muzeum Polska, Piaseczno

=== Portugal ===
- LOAD ZX Spectrum Museum, Cantanhede
- Museu Faraday, IST - Instituto Superior Técnico, Lisboa
- Nostalgica - Museu de Videojogos e tecnologia, Lisboa
- Museu dos Computadores Inforap, Braga
- Museu Virtual da Informática, Universidade do Minho, Braga
- Museu das Comunicações, Lisboa
- Museu Nacional de História Natural e da Ciência - Universidade de Lisboa, Lisboa

=== Romania ===
- Retro IT, Arad

=== Russia ===
- Museum of Soviet Arcade Machines, Moscow
- Yandex Museum, Moscow
- Yandex Museum, Saint-Petersburg
- Moscow Apple Museum
- Antimuseum of Computers and Games, Yekaterinburg
- Museum of Dmitriy Bachilo, Novosibirsk
- IT Museum of Perm University, Perm
- Cyber museum, Murom

=== Slovenia ===
- Computer History Museum Slovenia, Ljubljana

=== Slovakia ===
- Computer Museum SAV, Bratislava http://www.vystava.sav.sk

=== Spain ===
- Computer Museum Garcia Santesmases (MIGS), Complutense University
- Museum of Informatics, Polytechnic University of Valencia
- Museo de la Historia de la Computacion, Cáceres

=== Sweden ===
- Dalby Datormuseum, Dalby on the island Aspö north of Strängnäs

=== Switzerland ===
- Musée Bolo, Lausanne
- Enter Museum, Solothurn

=== Ukraine ===
- Software & Computer Museum, Kyiv, Kharkiv
- IT 8-bit

=== United Kingdom ===
- Northwest Computer Museum, Leigh, Greater Manchester
- The National Museum of Computing, Bletchley Park
- The Centre for Computing History, Cambridge
- Retro Computer Museum, Leicester
- Science Museum, London, London
- National Archive for the History of Computing, University of Manchester
- National Videogame Arcade, Nottingham
- Museum of Computing, Swindon
- Time Line Computer Archive, Wigton
- The Micro Museum, Ramsgate
- Home Computer Museum, Hull
- IBM Hursley Museum, Hursley
- Derby Computer Museum
- The ICL Computer Museum (UK)

See also: Computer Conservation Society

== North America ==
=== Canada ===
==== Manitoba ====
- Manitoba Computer & Gaming Museum , Winnipeg

==== Ontario ====
- Personal Computer Museum, Brantford
- University of Waterloo Computer Museum, Waterloo, Ontario
- Vintage Computer Museum, Toronto, Ontario
- York University Computer Museum or YUCoM, York University

==== Quebec ====
- EMusée, Montreal
- iMusée, Montreal

==== Saskatchewan ====
- University of Saskatchewan Computer Museum

=== United States ===
==== Arizona ====
- Southwest Museum of Engineering, Communications and Computation, Glendale, Arizona

==== California ====
- Computer History Museum, Mountain View, California
- DigiBarn Computer Museum, Boulder Creek, California
- Museum of Art and Digital Entertainment, Oakland, California
- The Tech Museum of Innovation, San Jose, California
- Intel Museum, Santa Clara, California

==== D.C. ====
- Smithsonian National Museum of American History, Washington, D.C.

==== Georgia ====
- Mimms Museum of Technology and Art, Roswell, Georgia
- Museum of Technology at Middle Georgia State University, Macon, Georgia

==== Kansas ====
- The Topeka Computing Museum, Topeka, Kansas - Now being liquidated, online archive only.

==== Maryland ====
- System Source Computer Museum, Hunt Valley, Maryland

==== Minnesota ====
- Charles Babbage Institute, University of Minnesota

==== Montana ====
- American Computer & Robotics Museum, Bozeman, Montana

==== New Jersey ====
- Vintage Computer Federation Museum, Wall, New Jersey

==== New York ====
- The Strong, International Center for the History of Electronic Games, Rochester, NY - Focus on Retrogaming but many games are on vintage personal computers.

==== Ohio ====
- Dayton Computer Museum, Riverside, Ohio - From 600 B.C. to the present. Examples of every Computer Generation with many from the beginning of personal computers. Not only the artifact, but the history, what does it do and how does it do it? A project of the Dayton Microcomputer Association.

==== Pennsylvania ====
- Kennett Classic Computer Museum, Kennett Square, Pennsylvania
- Large Scale Systems Museum, New Kensington, Pennsylvania
- The Computer History Learning Center aka The Computer Church, Parkesburg, Pennsylvania

==== Rhode Island ====
- Rhode Island Computer Museum, Warwick, Rhode Island

==== Texas ====
- National Videogame Museum, Frisco, Texas

==== Virginia ====
- U.Va. Computer Museum, University of Virginia
- Virginia Computer Museum

==== Washington ====
- Living Computers: Museum + Labs, Seattle, Washington - Closed in 2020, liquidated in 2024.
- Microsoft Visitor Center, Redmond, Washington
- The Interim Computer Museum, Tukwila, Washington

==== Wisconsin ====
- Chippewa Falls Museum of Industry and Technology, Chippewa Falls, Wisconsin - Exhibit offering "Seymour Cray and The Supercomputer"

== South America ==
=== Argentina ===
- Espacio TEC, Bahia Blanca
- Museo de Informática UNPA-UARG, Río Gallegos
- Museo de Informática de la República Argentina - Fundación ICATEC (closed), Ciudad Autónoma de Buenos Aires

=== Brasil ===
- Museu Capixaba do Computador, Vitória/ES
- Museu do Computador, São Paulo/SP

== Online ==
- MV Museu de Tecnologia (Brazil)
- Old Computer Museum
- San Diego Computer Museum - Physical objects were donated to the San Diego State University Library, but still does online exhibits
- Obsolete Computer Museum
- Old-Computers.com
- HP Computer Museum
- Early Office Museum
- IBM Archives
- EveryMac.com
- Bitsavers.org - Software and Document Archive
- TAM (The Apple Museum) - Apple Computers and Products
- Rewind Museum - Virtual museum with traveling physical exhibits
- The Computer Collector
- New Computer Museum
- IPSJ Computer Museum - Computers of Japan
- Freeman PC Museum
- FEMICOM Museum - Femininity in 20th century Video games, computers and electronic toys
- Home Computer Museum
- Malware Museum - Malware programs from the 80's and 90's that have been stripped of their destructive properties.
- History Computers
- KASS Computer Museum - A computer history museum & private collection
- Russian Virtual Computer Museum - a history of Soviet Computers from the late 1940s
- Soviet Digital Electronics Museum - a museum of Soviet electronic calculators, PCs and some other devices
- Development of Computer Science and Technologies in Ukraine - Ukrainian virtual Computer Museum
- Spectrum Generation collection, supporting the LOAD ZX Spectrum Museum in Portugal
- Home Computer Museum UK
- Vintage Mac Museum - Now a part of the American Computer & Robotics Museum in Bozeman, Montana.

== See also ==
- Computer museum
- List of video game museums
- List of science museums
- Computer Conservation Society (UK)
- History of computer hardware
- IT History Society
- Retrocomputing
- Vintage Computer Festival held annually in Mountain View, California, and elsewhere
- Technology museum
