= American Computer & Robotics Museum =

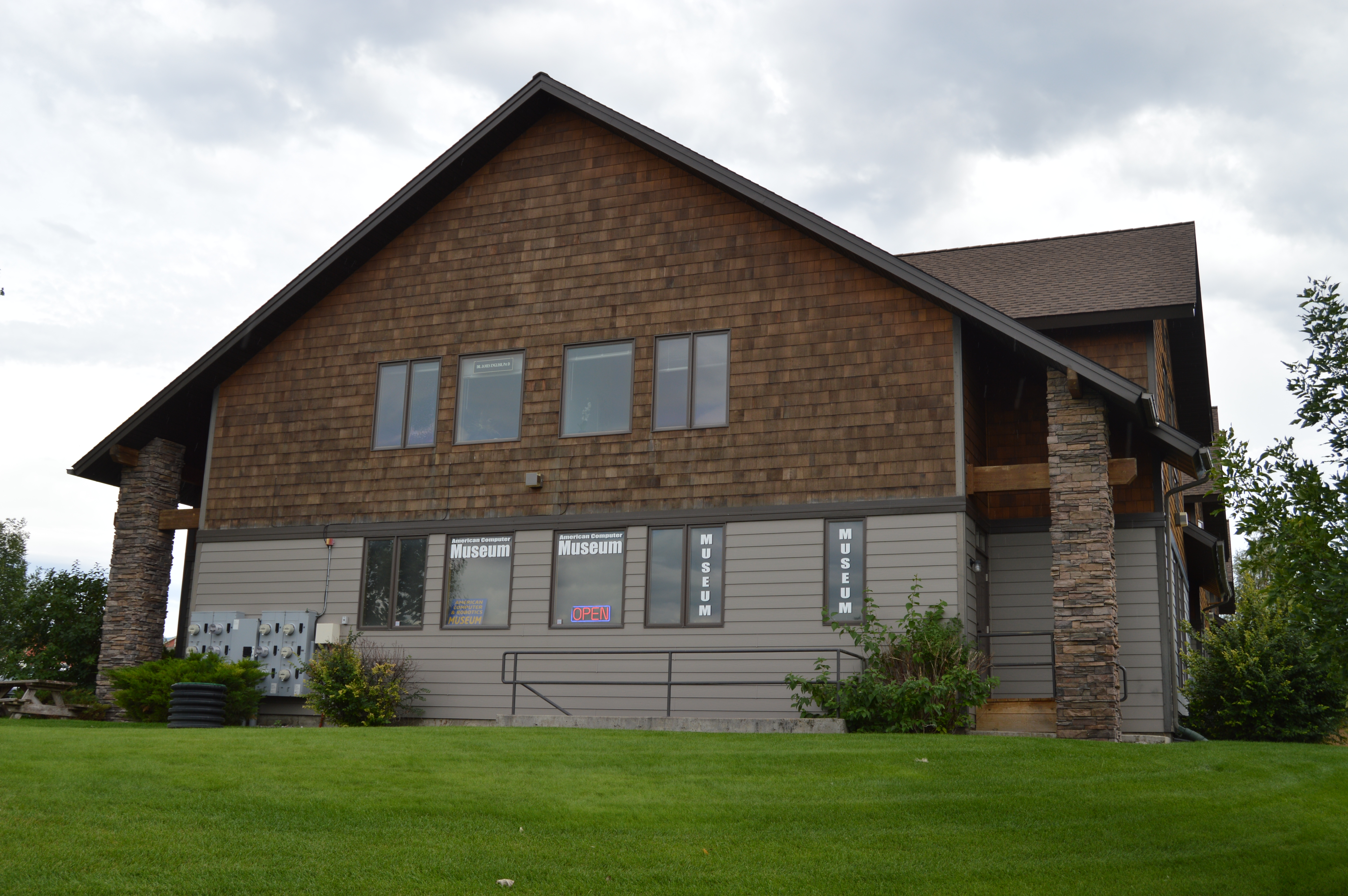
- Established: May 1990
- Location: 2023 Stadium Drive, Suite 1-A, Bozeman, Montana
- Coordinates: 45.65927°N 111.0550°W
- Type: Computer museum
- Website: www.acrmuseum.org

The American Computer & Robotics Museum (ACRM; formerly the American Computer Museum) is a museum of the history of computing, communications, artificial intelligence and robotics that is located in Bozeman, Montana, United States.

The museum's mission is "to explore the past and imagine the future of the Information Age through thought-provoking exhibits, innovative storytelling, and the bold exchange of ideas".

== History of the museum ==
The American Computer & Robotics Museum was founded by George and Barbara Keremedjiev as a non-profit organization in May 1990 in Bozeman, Montana. It is likely the oldest extant museum dedicated to the history of computers in the world. The museum's artifacts trace over 4,000 years of computing history and information technology. George Keremedjiev died in November 2018, but his wife Barbara, the museum board, and the museum's executive director continue working toward his goals to "collect, preserve, interpret, and display the artifacts and history of the information age."

== Exhibits on display ==
The museum has several permanent exhibits on display. The Benchmarks of the Information Age provides an overview of information technology from roughly 1860 B.C.E. with the development of ancient writing systems up to 1976 C.E. with the Apple I personal computer. Another significant exhibit is the NASA Apollo program, including NASA artifacts on loan from the National Air and Space Museum, such as an Apollo Guidance Computer and a watch worn on the Moon by Apollo 15 Commander David Scott, as well as the last surviving mainframe from the Apollo 11 mission, a UNIVAC 418-II. Another exhibit includes a comprehensive collection of early personal computers like the Altair 8800, IMSAI 8080, Commodore PET, Sol-20, Apple II, Apple III, Apple Lisa, Apple Macintosh, KIM-1, and SYM-1. The museum has several more exhibits detailing Enigma codebreaking during World War II, neural computing and artificial intelligence, office and communications technology, robotics and automation with Hollywood artifacts, video games, and the future of computing with an eye toward quantum computing. The museum's current special exhibit is the Vintage Mac Museum, a private collection recently donated to the ACRM by the family of collector Adam Rosen.

== Awards ==
In 1994 the American Computer Museum won the Dibner Award for Excellence in Museum Exhibits from the Society for the History of Technology.

Beginning in 1997, The American Computer Museum has presented the Stibitz-Wilson awards with support from Montana State University. The George R. Stibitz Computer & Communications Innovator Award is named for Dr. George R. Stibitz, who built the first electric binary adding unit in 1937. The Edward O. Wilson Biodiversity Technology Innovator Award is named for Harvard Emeritus Professor Dr. Edward O. Wilson. In 2011, the museum formalized a new category of award called Lifetime Achievement.

=== Stibitz Award winners ===
- 1997 – Arthur Burks, Chuan Chu, Jack Kilby, Jerry Merryman, James Van Tassel, Maury Irvine, Eldon Hall, Ted Hoff, Federico Faggin
- 1998 – Ed Roberts, Doug Engelbart
- 1999 – James Harris, Vinton G. Cerf, Robert E. Kahn
- 2000 – Steve Wozniak, Tim Berners-Lee, Ray Tomlinson
- 2001 – Ted Hoff, Federico Faggin and Stan Mazor (together)
- 2002 – Ralph Baer, Martin Cooper, Leroy Hood, Klein Gilhousen, James Russell, Jon Titus
- 2005 – Ross Perot, Paul Baran, John Blankenbaker
- 2006 – Edward O. Wilson
- 2010 – Barbara Liskov, Max Mathews, Steve Sasson
- 2012 – Robert Metcalfe, Vic Hayes
- 2013 – Walt Disney (posthumously awarded), Chuck Hull, John Henry Holland, Jean B. Sweeney
- 2014 – Eric Horvitz, Douglas Hofstadter, Hans Moravec, Edward Feigenbaum, David Andes, Cynthia Breazeal
- 2015 – David Ferrucci, Robert Gunderson
- 2016 – Alan Turing (posthumously awarded), Joseph Desch, Mary Shaw
- 2017 – Jennifer Doudna, Michelle Simmons, Mark Ritter, Rufus Cone, Jerry M. Chow, Jay Gambetta
- 2018 – Donna Dubinsky, Bonnie J. Dunbar

=== Wilson Award winners ===
- 2009 – Ignacio Rodriguez-Iturbe, Steve Running, Michael Soulé, David Ward
- 2010 – Sir Alec Jeffreys, Lynn Margulis, David Quammen
- 2011 – Jim Lotimer, John Kress, Peter Belhumeur, David Jacobs
- 2012 – Paul Anastas, May Berenbaum, Gary Strobel
- 2013 – Frans de Waal
- 2014 – Rebecca D. Costa, Dorothy Hinshaw Patent, Cathy Whitlock, John Charles Priscu
- 2015 – Janine Benyus, Kjetil Våge, Laurie Marker
- 2016 – Dan Wenk
- 2017 – Jennifer Doudna, John Heminway
- 2018 – Diana Six, Andone C. Lavery, Bonnie J. Dunbar

=== Lifetime Achievement Award Winners ===
- 2011 – Federico Faggin
- 2017 – Jonathan Titus

=== Stibitz-Wilson Awards ===
- 2022 - Paula Apsell, J. Craig Venter, Steve Wozniak
- 2023 - Sylvia Earle, Nature (TV program), Gregory L. Robinson
- 2024 - Maya Ajmera, Charles Limb, Dr. Russell Taylor, Irving Weissman
- 2025 - Serge Belongie & Pietro Perona (together), Lorrie Cranor, Yasmin Kafai, Mitchel Resnick

== Collection ==
The ACRM's collection contains a wide variety of objects that span over 4,000 years of information technology history, beginning with a Babylonian cuneiform tablet dated to between 1860 and 1837 B.C.E. and a replica of the Antikythera Mechanism, the earliest known geared mechanism, circa 80 B.C.E. The Antikythera Mechanism is an ancient Greek analog computer and orrery used to predict astronomical positions and eclipses for calendar and astrological purposes.

The ACRM has a large collection of historical books, documents, and artifacts related to the history of computing, communications, and knowledge dating back to 1605, including original manuscripts by Francis Bacon and René Descartes and original copies of Newton's Principia & Opticks and Locke's Essay Concerning Human Understanding.

The museum also has a vast collection of early office technologies including mechanical adding machines like the Arithmometer, electromechanical/electronic calculators (Friden, SCM, Monroe, Mathatron, Anita, Cal Tech (calculator), and Wang), telephones, telegraphs, typewriters, cash registers, and several telephone switchboards. It also holds an IBM 409 (relay-based tabulator) and a IBM 604 (vacuum tube calculator), mechanical adding machines, and a variety of slide rules.

The museum also has military technology, including a Minuteman 1 Missile Guidance Computer and a Norden bombsight.

The museum's collection also includes mechanical, electrical, and electronic toys, an industrial robot, and early consumer robots like Hubot.

Additionally, the museum has a replica of the Model K, the first binary adder, built for the museum by its inventor, George R. Stibitz. Also, the ACRM holds many mainframe computers and associated hardware from the 1950s to 1990s including the IBM 1620 Model II, the IBM System/360 Model 20, the Burroughs 205, PDP-8, PDP-8/ and the UNIVAC 1004.

The museum also features a UNIVAC 418-II formerly used by NASA for telemetry data processing support for the Apollo missions, including Apollo 11 in 1969, and later on in 1977 for the first Space Shuttle Approach and Landing Tests (ALT) of the first Space Shuttle orbiter, the Enterprise, before NASA retired the system and donated it to the ACRM. The 418-II on exhibit at the museum is the last surviving mainframe computer used by NASA for the Apollo missions.

Signed artifacts at the ACRM include an original Altair 8800 signed by Ed Roberts and an original Apple I signed and donated by Steve Wozniak. The museum also has an original January 1975 Popular Electronics Magazine announcing the Altair signed by Ed Roberts, Bill Gates, Paul Allen and Monte Davidoff.

== See also ==
- Computer museum
