= Charles Limb =

American surgeon, neuroscientist, and musician

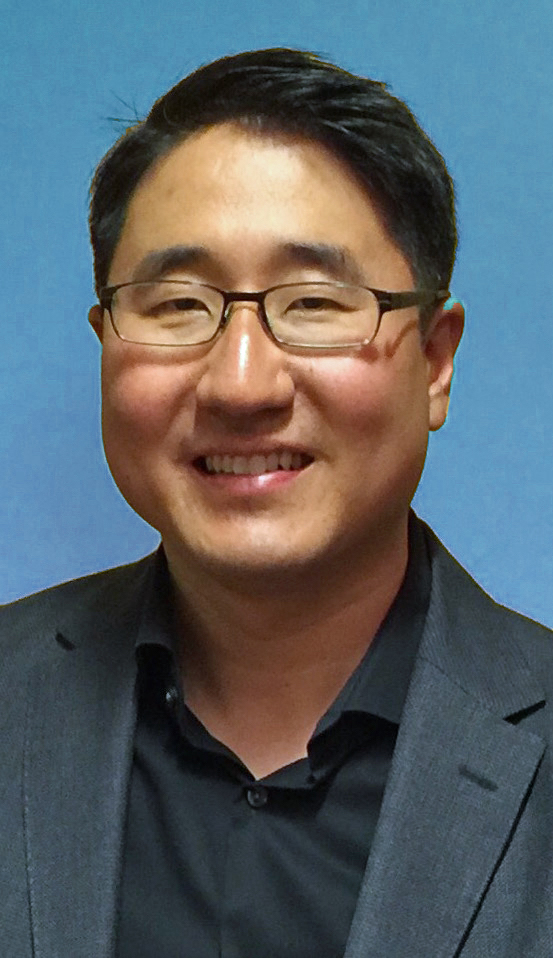
- Citizenship: United States
- Education: Harvard College, Yale School of Medicine
- Known for: Research on neural substrates of creativity and improvisation, as well as on cochlear implants and perception of music
- Scientific career
- Fields: Neuroscience, music, otology, neurotology
- Workplaces: University of California, San Francisco; Johns Hopkins University

Dr. Charles Limb is a surgeon, neuroscientist, and musician at the University of California, San Francisco (UCSF) who has carried out research on the neural basis of musical creativity and the impact of cochlear implants on music perception in hearing impaired individuals. As an otologic surgeon and otolaryngologist, he specializes in treatment of ear disorders.

In his research, he has focused on imaging the brains of jazz artists as they improvise in the fMRI. He has worked under the assumption that improvisation is important to creativity more generally, and creativity is vital to basic problem-solving, evolution, and survival.

== Academic background ==
Limb teaches at UCSF, where he is the Francis A. Sooy Professor of Otolaryngology–Head and Neck Surgery, and the Chief of the Division of Otology, Neurotology and Skull Base Surgery at UCSF. In addition, he holds a joint faculty appointment in the Department of Neurological Surgery and is the Director of the Douglas Grant Cochlear Implant Center.

He earned his bachelor's degree at Harvard University, where he directed a jazz band. Later he attended the Yale University School of Medicine, where he played jazz in New Haven restaurants. After graduating from medical school in 1996, he completed a surgical internship in General Surgery, a residency in Otolaryngology–Head and Neck Surgery, and a subspecialty fellowship in Neurotology at Johns Hopkins Hospital in Baltimore. He also completed one postdoctoral research fellowship at the Center for Hearing Sciences at Johns Hopkins with Dr. David Ryugo, where he investigated the development of the auditory brainstem, and a second at the National Institutes of Health, where he used fMRI devices to image brain activity when jazz musicians improvise music. He joined the faculty of Johns Hopkins Hospital in 2003, where he remained until 2015, as associate professor of Otolaryngology–Head and Neck Surgery. During this time, he was also a Faculty Member at the Peabody Conservatory of Music and the Johns Hopkins University School of Education, as well as Scientific Advisor to the Baltimore Symphony Orchestra.

== Research ==
Limb has stated that he wants to know what went on in John Coltrane’s head when he improvised masterpieces on the saxophone. He has researched creativity with jazz musicians because they can improvise on cue, even in the laboratory conditions of an fMRI. In several experiments, he has captured moving pictures of their brain activity as they create.

In one, he found that improvising musicians showed: 1) deactivation of the dorsolateral prefrontal cortex, which among other functions acts as a kind of self-censor, and 2) greater activation of the medial prefrontal cortex, which connects to a brain system called the “default network.” The default network is associated with introspective tasks such as retrieving personal memories and daydreaming. It has to do with one’s sense of self.

In another experiment, he and his team demonstrated that when two jazz musicians are “trading fours,” that is, having an interactive musical conversation, they utilize brain areas important in linguistic grammar and syntax. The finding suggests that these regions process auditory communication generally, rather than just for spoken language.

Limb also investigated the relationship between emotion and creativity. He asked jazz musicians in the fMRI to improvise music they felt corresponded to the emotions in photos of a sad, neutral, and happy woman. He found that when musicians responded to happy photos, the dorsolateral prefrontal cortex deactivated much more than in the other conditions. The study also asked why we feel pleasure in sad music, and found that while musicians showed more frontal deactivation and deeper flow states when responding to the happy photos, the creation of sad music elicited a stronger visceral experience and greater activity in the brain's reward centers.

In addition, he has researched music perception in deaf individuals with cochlear implants. As a temporal bone surgeon, he places these devices in patients, and the implants let them hear speech well, but they have trouble perceiving elements of music such as harmony and timbre, as well as performing higher integration. He has recommended training programs and technological innovation to overcome this deficit. Limb has also examined the creativity of composers such as Beethoven and Smetana, who became deaf as adults yet continued to write great music, and he has written about the fact that Thomas Edison invented the phonograph despite his loss of hearing.

== Publications and editorships ==
Limb is the former Editor-in-Chief of Trends in Hearing (then called Trends in Amplification), the only journal focused on hearing aids and other auditory amplification devices, and an Editorial Board Member of the journals Otology & Neurotology and Music and Medicine. He has authored over 150 scholarly works.

== Speeches ==
He has given two TED talks. In the first, “Your Brain on Improv,” he showed how during jazz improvisation the brain deactivates the dorsolateral prefrontal cortex and activates the medial prefrontal cortex. In the second, “Building the Musical Muscle,” he described restoring music perception in the deaf and focused on the challenges faced by cochlear implant users when trying to process music. He has also been a featured panelist at the Sundance Film Festival, and he has spoken about his work internationally in Europe, Asia, Australia, and Canada.

=== Other media appearances ===
Among the media outlets and organizations that have featured his work are the New York Times, CNN, PBS, National Geographic, Scientific American, the BBC, the Smithsonian Institution, National Public Radio, the Library of Congress, the American Museum of Natural History, the Kennedy Center, the Baltimore Symphony Orchestra, and the Canadian Broadcasting Company.

== Awards and honors ==
Limb won the 2004 Resident Teaching Award at Johns Hopkins Hospital, was named one of the "Top Doctors in Baltimore" in 2007 by Baltimore magazine. In 2011, he restored the hearing of the daughter of an FBI member stationed in Iraq. The U.S. flag was flown in Limb's honor over the American Embassy in Baghdad. In 2016, he won the UCSF Department of Otolaryngology–Head and Neck Surgery Resident Teaching Award. He was also named in 2022 as one of the Kennedy Center's Next 50, a group of fifty national cultural leaders who are “moving us toward a more inspired, inclusive, and compassionate world”. Most recently, in 2024, he was the recipient of an American Computer & Robotics Museum Stibitz-Wilson Award.
