= Susanne Boll =

German professor

Susanne Boll (academic name)
- Born: 1967 (age 58–59); Germany
- Education: Technical University of Darmstadt; Technical University of Vienna
- Known for: Interactive Multimedia, HCI in Health
- Awards: ACM Distinguished Member (2019) acatech (2017); GI Fellow (2020)
- Scientific career
- Fields: Multimedia; Human Computer Interaction
- Workplaces: University of Oldenburg; University of Vienna; University of Ulm; GMD
- Thesis: ZYX-a multimedia document model for reuse and adaptation of multimedia content (2001)
- Doctoral advisor: Wolfgang Klas, University of Vienna
- Doctoral students: Wilko Heuten, Niels Henze
- Website: susanneboll.de

Susanne Boll is a Professor for Media Informatics and Multimedia Systems in the Department of Computing Science at the University of Oldenburg, Germany. and is a member of the board at the research institute OFFIS. She is a member of SIGMM and SIGCHI of the ACM as well as the German Informatics Society GI. She founded and directs the HCI Lab at the University of Oldenburg and OFFIS.

Her research is positioned at the intersection of human-computer interaction (HCI) and interactive multimedia.

== Education ==
Boll graduated in Computer Science from the Department of Computer Science of the Technische Universität Darmstadt, Germany. She received her PhD in 2001 from the Vienna University of Technology. Core elements of her dissertation in the field multimedia document modeling were published in the IEEE Transactions on Knowledge and Data Engineering 2001.

== Research ==
Boll's early works on semantic multimedia models have been published in the IEEE Transactions on Knowledge and Data Engineering in 2001. She has developed her research area from multimedia models into interactive multimedia systems and interactive systems. She is working on novel topics in the field of multimedia and human computer interaction. She organized the first ACM Workshop on Social Media at ACM Multimedia in 2009 and the first Workshop on Multimedia for Personal Health and Health Care at ACM Multimedia in 2017.

== Professional service and leadership ==
Boll is a member of both ACM SIGMM and ACM SIGCHI. Boll has been a Member at Large in the Executive Committee of SIGMM for several years. She has been the ACM SIGCHI Vice president for Conferences 2021-2024 . She has been serving as Program Co-Chair of ACM Multimedia in 2017, as General Co-Chair of ACM Multimedia, as Program Chair of MobileHCI in 2019, and as General Chair of MobileHCI in 2020. She is a member of the SC of the ACM MobileHCI Conference and SC Chair of the Steering Committee of the ACM AutomotiveUI Conference.

Boll was the organizer of several international retreats at Dagstuhl Castle to which she invited researchers to join her in discussing trends, challenges and future directions in multimedia, understanding social media, interactive systems for personal health and automotive user interfaces in times of automation.

In 2019, Boll was appointed Director of Diversity and Outreach in the Executive Committee of ACM SIGMM. She initiated the 25 in 25 strategy in which ACM SIGMM wants to overcome its relatively low representation of women in all activities and has decided on 10 actions to achieve at least 25% female participation at all levels and for all roles on all levels by 2025.

Boll is also involved in Plattform Lernende Systeme - Germany's Platform for Artificial Intelligence. There she leads the working group Innovation, Business Models and Processes and advises politics as well as society on current AI topics.

== Awards and honours ==
Boll was named a Fellow of the German Informatics Society in October 2020. She was named an ACM Distinguished Member in 2019, the only European woman among the year's 62 inductees. She is an elected member of acatech, the National Academy of Science and Engineering. She was elected a member (Fachkollegiatin) of the German Science Foundation (DFG) board of reviewers for two terms in Computer Science from 2016 until 2024. She was also the spokesperson of this board in one term since 2020. Since 2026, Susanne Boll is an elected Member of Senate of the Deutsche Forschungsgemeinschaft (DFG, German Research Foundation).

== Selected research papers ==
- Marion Koelle, Swamy Ananthanarayan, and Susanne Boll. 2020. Social Acceptability in HCI: A Survey of Methods, Measures, and Design Strategies. Proceedings of the 2020 CHI Conference on Human Factors in Computing Systems (CHI '20). ACM, New York, NY, USA, 19 pages.
- Andrii Matviienko, Swamy Ananthanarayan, Abdallah El Ali, Wilko Heuten, and Susanne Boll. 2019. NaviBike: Comparing Unimodal Navigation Cues for Child Cyclists. In Proceedings of the 2019 CHI Conference on Human Factors in Computing Systems (CHI '19). ACM, New York, NY, USA, Paper 620, 12 pages.
- Larbi Abdenebaoui, Benjamin Meyer, Anton Bruns and Susanne Boll. 2018. UNNA: A Unified Neural Network for Aesthetic Assessment. International Conference on Content-Based Multimedia Indexing (CBMI), La Rochelle, 2018, pp. 1–6.
- Torben Wallbaum, Andrii Matviienko, Swamy Ananthanarayan, Thomas Olsson, Wilko Heuten, and Susanne C.J. Boll. 2018. Supporting Communication between Grandparents and Grandchildren through Tangible Storytelling Systems. In Proceedings of the 2018 CHI Conference on Human Factors in Computing Systems (CHI '18). ACM, New York, NY, USA, 12 pages.
- Abdallah El Ali, Tim C. Stratmann, Souneil Park, Johannes Schöning, Wilko Heuten, and Susanne Boll. Measuring, Understanding, and Classifying News Media Sympathy on Twitter after Crisis Events. In Proceedings of the 2018 CHI Conference on Human Factors in Computing Systems (CHI '18). ACM, New York, NY, USA, 13 pages.
- Uwe Grünefeld, Andreas Löcken, Yvonne Brück, Susanne Boll, Wilko Heuten. 2018. Where to Look: Exploring Peripheral Cues for Shifting Attention to Spatially Distributed Out-of-View Objects. AutomotiveUI 2018: 221-228
- Andrii Matviienko, Swamy Ananthanarayan, Shadan Sadeghian Borojeni, Yannick Feld, Wilko Heuten, Susanne Boll. Augmenting bicycles and helmets with multimodal warnings for children. MobileHCI 2018: 15:1-15:13
- Marion Koelle, Katrin Wolf, and Susanne Boll. 2018. Beyond LED Status Lights - Design Requirements of Privacy Notices for Body-worn Cameras. In Proceedings of the Twelfth International Conference on Tangible, Embedded, and Embodied Interaction (TEI '18). Association for Computing Machinery, New York, NY, USA, 177–187.
- Andreas Löcken, Sarah Blum, Tim Claudius Stratmann, Uwe Gruenefeld, Wilko Heuten, Susanne Boll, and Steven van de Par. Effects of location and fade-in time of (audio-)visual cues on response times and success-rates in a dual-task experiment. In Proceedings of the ACM Symposium on Applied Perception (SAP '17). ACM, New York, NY, USA, Article 12, 4 pages.
- Jochen Meyer, Merlin Wasmann, Wilko Heuten, Abdallah El Ali, and Susanne Boll Identification and Classification of Usage Patterns in Long-Term Activity Tracking. Proceedings of the 2017 CHI Conference on Human Factors in Computing Systems (CHI '17). ACM, New York, NY, USA, 667–678.
- Marion Koelle, Abdallah El Ali, Vanessa Cobus, Wilko Heuten, and Susanne Boll. 2017. All about Acceptability? Identifying Factors for the Adoption of Data Glasses. Proceedings of the 2017 CHI Conference on Human Factors in Computing Systems (CHI '17). Association for Computing Machinery, New York, NY, USA, 295–300, 5 pages.
- Andres. L. Kun, Orit Shaer, Albrecht Schmidt and Susanne Boll. 2017. Ubicomp without Borders: International Experiences in Pervasive Computing, in IEEE Pervasive Computing, vol. 16, no. 4, pp. 17–21, October–December 2017.
- Andreas Löcken, Sarah Blum, Tim Claudius Stratmann, Uwe Gruenefeld, Wilko Heuten, Susanne Boll, Steven van de Par. Effects of Location and Fade-in Time of (audio-)visual Cues on Response Times and Success-rates in a Dual-task Experiment. SAP 2017: 12:1-12:4
- Uwe Gruenefeld, Abdallah El Ali, Wilko Heuten, and Susanne Boll. 2017. Visualizing Out-of-View Objects in Head-mounted Augmented Reality. In Proceedings of the 19th International Conference on Human-Computer Interaction with Mobile Devices and Services (MobileHCI '17). ACM, New York, NY, USA, Article 81, 7 pages.

== Sources ==
- https://web.archive.org/web/20070831131821/http://sigmm.utdallas.edu/Members/susanne
- http://medien.informatik.uni-oldenburg.de/susanneboll
- http://www.informatik.uni-trier.de/~ley/db/indices/a-tree/b/Boll:Susanne.html
- http://www.offis.de/f_e_bereiche/gesundheit/personen/details/profile/prof-dr-techn-susanne-boll-westermann.html
- http://www.presse.uni-oldenburg.de/mit/2006/366.html
