= Computer History Museum Slovenia =

Museum in Ljubljana, Slovenia

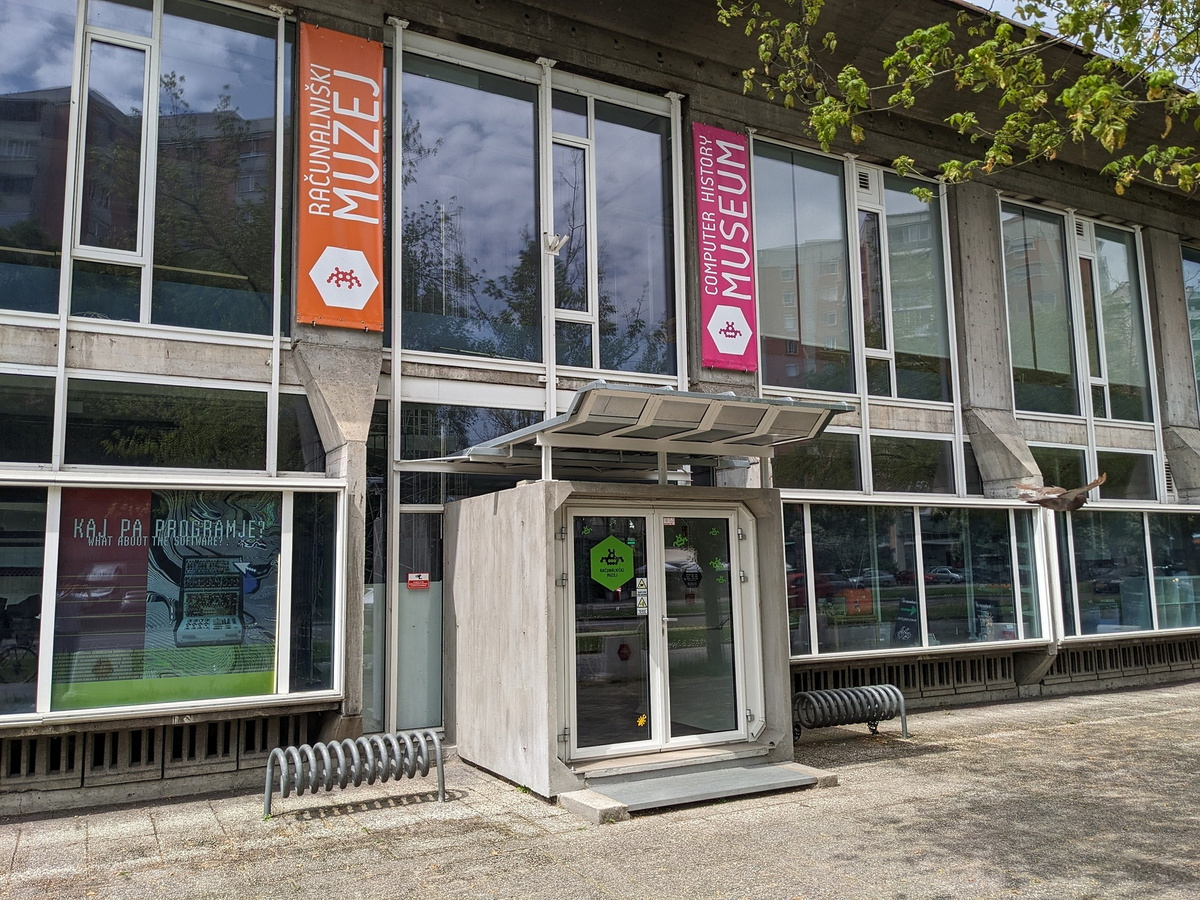
- Established: 2004; 22 years ago
- Location: Celovška 111, Ljubljana, Slovenia
- Coordinates: 46.068611°N 14.490278°E
- Type: Computer museum
- Website: www.racunalniski-muzej.si

The Computer History Museum Slovenia (Slovene: Računalniški muzej) is a computer museum in Ljubljana, Slovenia dedicated to preserving the history of computing and digital heritage. Highlighting computer artifacts tied to global computer history, the museum also presents a substantial collection of items linked to early Yugoslav and Slovene computer systems.

== Overview ==
Located in the Šiška District of Ljubljana, museum claims to host more than 6,500 collection items housed within its 700 m^{2} (7,500 sq ft) premises. The museum also functions as a makerspace and an event space for festivals, film shoots, coworking, conferences, public presentations and meetups. Educative workshops are organized, mostly for younger age groups, children from schools in Slovenia, Italy, and visitor groups from the region. In 'open lab' series, workshops for museum staff are open to the public, such as the one where a replica of the Apple I computer was being assembled.

The Computer History Museum is designated as a UNESCO Software Heritage Ambassador and is an active member of ICOM and the DOORS – Digital Incubator of Museums network.

== History ==
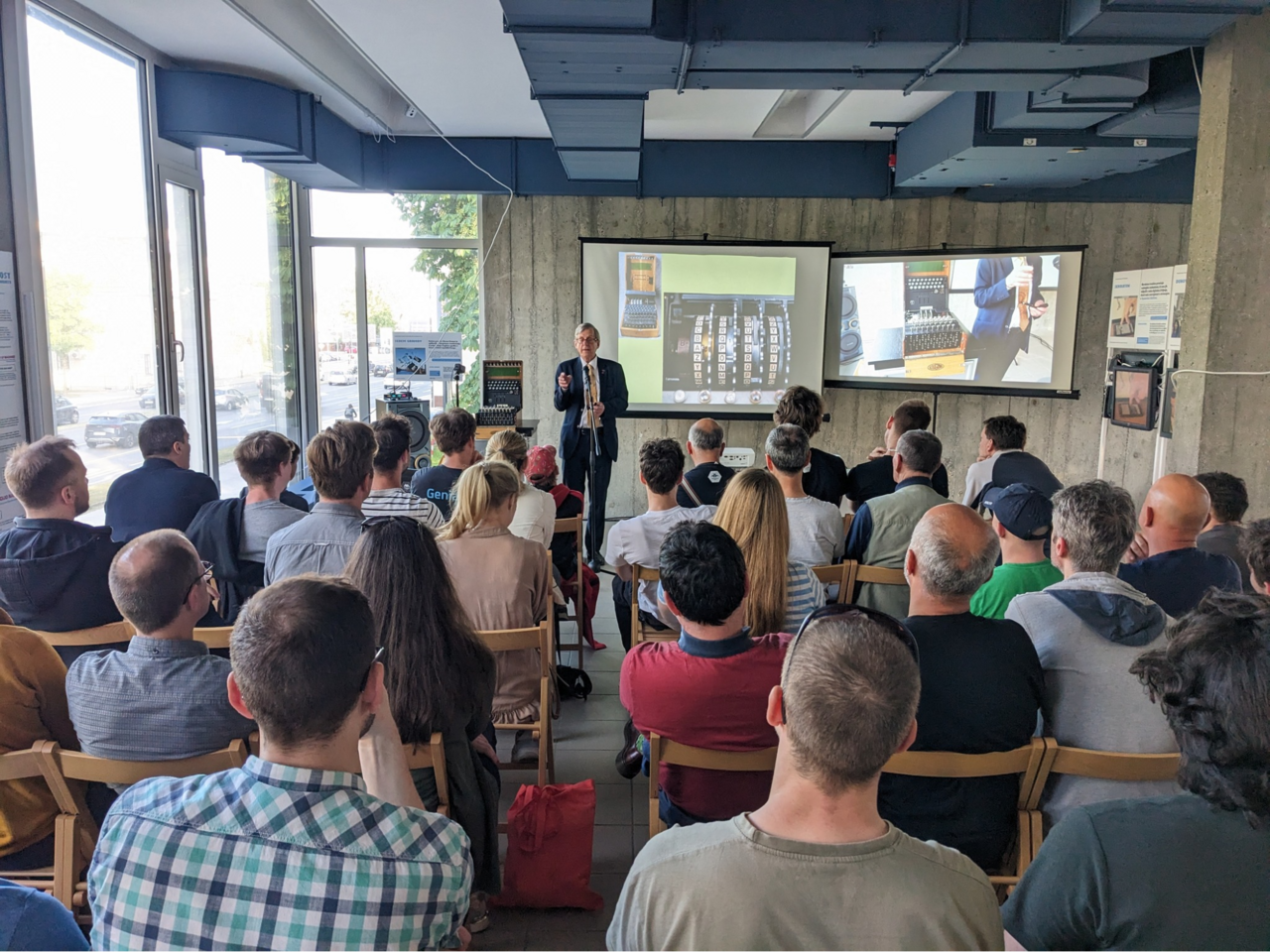
Dr Mark Baldwin holds a talk on the Enigma machine in the museum

The museum's origins are intertwined with the Cyberpipe (Slovene: Kiberpipa) hackerspace, which functioned as a cultural center and hacklab. Founded by Cyberpipe hackers, the museum emerged as an integral part of the hackerspace, later becoming a separate entity. Having evolved through various incarnations since 2004, the museum initially found its home in the basement space of a student organization. At one point, the museum lost its own exhibition spaces and refocused on travelling exhibitions in other institutions. The museum gained the attention of a sponsor in 2017 who acquired a quarter of the architecturally significant brutalist building designed by Miloš Bonča. They funded its renovation, with the vision of transforming it into the future home of the museum. In 2019. the museum found its home within the former commercial pavilion building.

In 2022, the Computer History Museum hosted Jason Scott, an American archivist and technology historian affiliated with the Internet Archive and known for his documentary film BBS: The Documentary, which explores the world of Bulletin Board Systems (BBSs).

In 2023, a hands-on demonstration featuring an authentic Enigma machine took place within the premises of the museum. The event was conducted by Dr. Mark Baldwin. Attendees were given the opportunity to closely observe the artifact and to interact with it firsthand, allowing them to touch, photograph, and even play with the machine.

In 2024, the museum collaborated with Radio Študent to host a radio broadcast featuring ZX Spectrum programs. Listeners had the opportunity to record the tones from the broadcast onto cassette tapes. Upon inserting these tapes into their ZX Spectrum computers, they could load computer games. The game transmitted during this broadcast was Kontrabant 2, a Slovenian text adventure where players collect and smuggle microcomputer parts from around the world to assemble a working computer.

== Exhibits ==
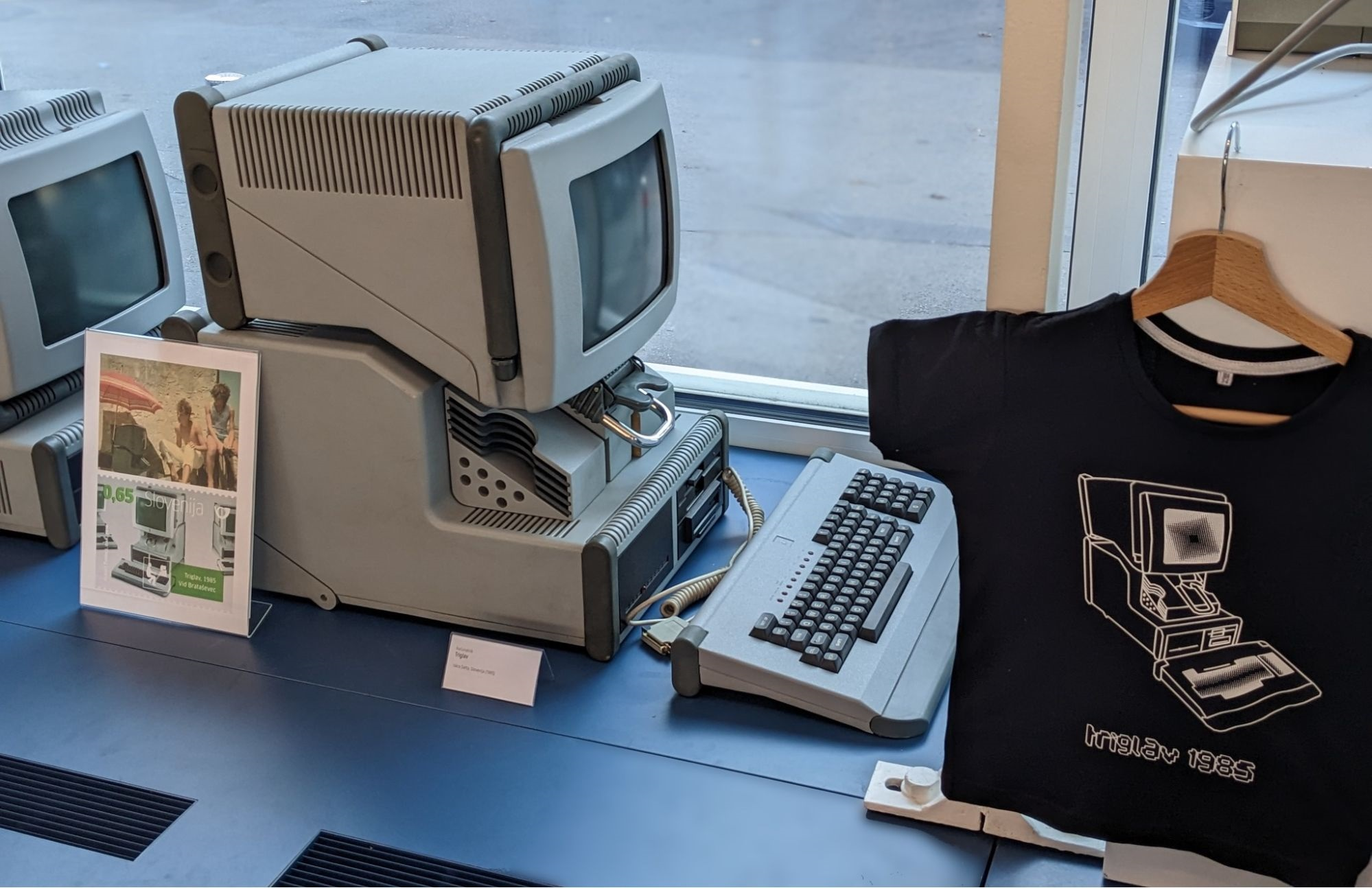
Slovenian computer, Triglav, and a t-shirt featuring its design

Most of the computers and devices are completely restored and functioning so visitors can try them and even use custom programs made by the museum. Early home computers and PCs are present, including TI-99/4A, TRS-80, Kaypro, Commodore 64, Amiga, ZX Spectrum, BBC Micro, Oric, Philips MSX, Sharp MZ, Atari 800, Atari ST, Apple Lisa, Apple II, Macintosh SE, Tektronix 4051, IBM PC, NeXT, Sun and SGI workstations. In addition to personal computers, video game consoles like Vectrex, Magnavox Odyssey, Atari 2600, Intellivision and Coleco Telstar Arcade are part of the collections. DEC mainframe-like systems, terminals, and mainframe computer cabinets are on display. The domestic mainframe based on VAX is exhibited, while ADM-3A, VT52, VT100, and Minitel terminals have been connected to modern single-board computers to enable their use. Computer systems from Slovenia and former Yugoslavia are featured in the museum, including Gorenje Delta PAKA 3000, Iskra Delta Partner, Triglav, TIM-011 and Orao. Czechoslovak analog computer MEDA 41TC is partially restored and displayed.

The museum houses an extensive collection of software, many of which are connected to Slovenia. It offers exploration into Yugoslav and Slovene MS-DOS programs and games, as well as showcases Slovenian Linux distributions and their historical significance. Additionally, there are various operating systems on display, including Windows 3.1x, Windows 95, MS-DOS, Mac OS, OS/2, and several Unix variants. Special attention is dedicated to Slovenian localized versions of operating systems.

Regarding data archiving devices and storage media, the museum claims to exhibit a diverse showcase. The IBM 129 and IBM 010 keypunch machines are on display, along with punched cards and punched tapes. Visitors can engage in classic gaming by playing games from discs, tapes, or cartridges. The collection of old telecommunication devices of various kinds is present, including early modems and acoustic couplers.

=== Research ===
The museum's team is actively delving into the history of computing in Slovenia, leading to the publication of several articles in the museum's publications. Notably, they have compiled a timeline highlighting the inaugural use of computers in Slovenia dating back to 1956. The museum's website features a dedicated section showcasing a comprehensive list of these computers. This list is categorized by year, type, location, and associated institution, complete with the necessary references for each entry.

The team has also crafted numerous articles spotlighting the pioneering domestic computer system manufacturers in Slovenia, including notable entities like Iskra Delta. This company, situated in the former Yugoslavia with a significant presence in Slovenia, was dedicated to the production of minicomputers and computer-related innovations throughout the 1970s and beyond. In these articles, the museum examines the company's production history, historical progression, anecdotes, and milestones related to Iskra Delta, providing a comprehensive view of its legacy.

== See also ==
- Iskra Delta
- HomeComputerMuseum
- Computer museums
- History of computing
