= Wolfgang Nebel =

German computer scientist

- Born: 15 November 1956 (age 69)
- Occupations: Computer Scientist & Professor

Wolfgang Nebel (born 15 November 1956) is a German computer scientist and professor for integrated circuit design at the computer science (Informatik) department of the Carl von Ossietzky University of Oldenburg.

== Biography ==
Nebel holds a Dipl.-Ing. degree in Electrical Engineering from the Leibniz University Hannover and a Dr.-Ing. degree from the Computer Science Department of the University of Kaiserslautern, where he has worked for Reiner Hartenstein. In 1987 Nebel joined Philips Semiconductors, Hamburg, and worked as software engineer, CAD project manager and finally became CAD software development manager. In 1993 he was appointed to the professorship VLSI design at the department of computer science at the Carl von Ossietzky University of Oldenburg. From 1996 to 1998 he served as dean of his department. Additionally since 1998 Nebel has been a member of the executive board of the OFFIS research center, an institute for information technology which is associated with Oldenburg University. From January 2001 December 2002 Nebel served as vice-president of Oldenburg University. Since June 2005 he has been chairman of the OFFIS – Institute for Information Technology. Nebel is co-founder, chairman and CTA of ChipVision Design Systems AG, an EDA start-up company located in Oldenburg, San Ramon, San Jose and Munich.

Nebel is and has been involved in several international conferences as program chair or a general chair. He is also active in several additional program committees and professional organizations. His research interest are in methodologies and tools for embedded system design, in particular: object oriented HW/SW specification and synthesis as well as design for low power.
