= Museum of Computing Machinery =

Computer Science Museum

Coordinates: 43°43′00″N 10°23′25″E

The Museum of Computing Machinery (Italian: Museo degli Strumenti per il Calcolo) is a computer museum in Pisa, Italy. The museum presents a collection of instruments for computing, including mechanical calculators, mainframe computers, and personal computers. Located in the Cittadella Galileiana, it is part of the Museum System of the University of Pisa,

Founded in 1993, the museum houses a collection of more than 10,000 items documenting the history of computing. As its core pieces, it hosts the Pisa Electronic Calculator, the final version of the first Italian computer, Olivetti's Elea 6001 mainframe computer, and Elea 9104, also known as the Computer of the National Institute of Computing Applications. Its exhibition about the history of personal computing shows the scientific and technological development of computing machinery for personal use. The museum offers interactive experiences.
