= Oldenburger Computer-Museum =

Museum in Oldenburg, Germany

Coordinates: 53°08′38″N 8°13′15″E

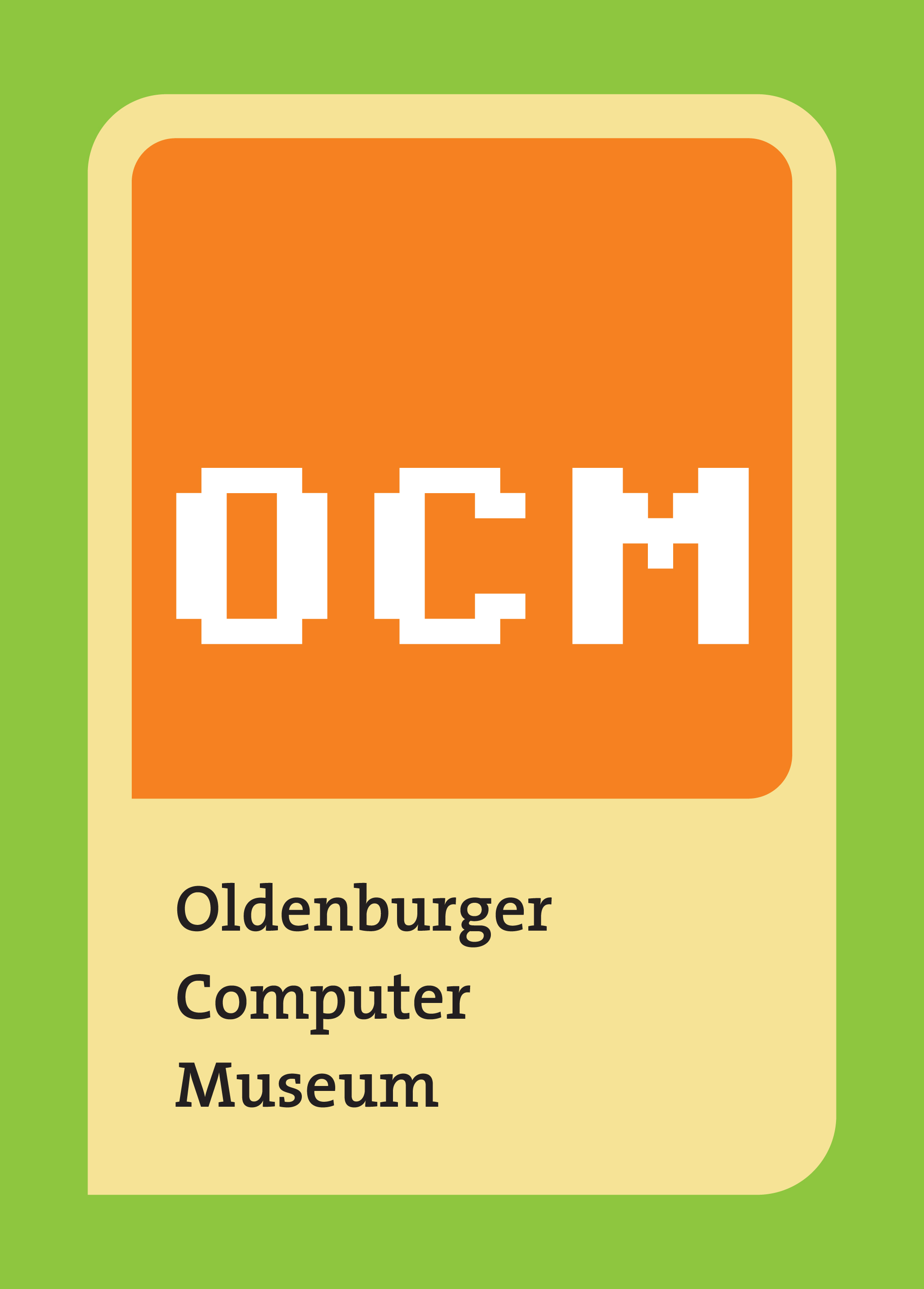
- Established: 2008
- Location: Oldenburg, Germany
- Website: www.computermuseum-oldenburg.de

The Oldenburg Computer Museum (OCM) is a museum founded in 2008 in Oldenburg (Oldb), Lower-Saxony, Germany that is dedicated to the preservation and operational presentation of the history of home computing.

== Overview ==
The museum presents computers, video game consoles, and arcade video game machines from the 1970s through 1990s. The exhibits are functional and invite visitors to try out and use them. Founded in 2008 by the non-profit association "Oldenburger Computer-Museum e. V.”, which is organised and run by dedicated volunteers. The goal of the Oldenburger Computer Museum is the preservation of the home computer culture as an interactive exhibition with fully functional exhibits. Everything on exhibit is equipped with software, which can - and should - be used, explored and experienced. In this way, visitors can get a sense of how computer technology has developed over time and how it relates to current technology, especially with regard to aspects like; graphics, sound, speed, mass storage, and the reduction in size of components.

At the Oldenburger Computer Museum one can play games on the Commodore 64, Atari 2600, and Amiga, write their own programs on original software and experience hands-on the history of computing.

== History ==
The museum grew out of the private collection of Thiemo Eddiks. In the beginning, small temporary exhibitions were presented in the OFFIS - Institute for Computer Science and the Carl von Ossietzky University in Oldenburg as well as in other locations. In November 2008, the permanent exhibition was officially opened. In November 2009 the association, “Oldenburger Computer- Museum e. V.” was founded und was recognized as a non-profit organization. Initially started as an exhibition in a small space, the move to the current larger location took place in 2014. In addition to the permanent exhibition “Home computers of the 1970’s and 80’s”, a classic video arcade hall has also been created.

== Exhibition ==
The permanent exhibition, “Homecomputers of the 1970’s and 1980’s" showcases 23 functional computer systems, including PDP-8, Commodore PET, Apple II, Osborne 1, Amstrad CPC 464, Apple Macintosh and Amiga 500 and is open every Tuesday from 6pm until 9pm.
