= Gregory L. Robinson =

American engineering manager (born 1960)

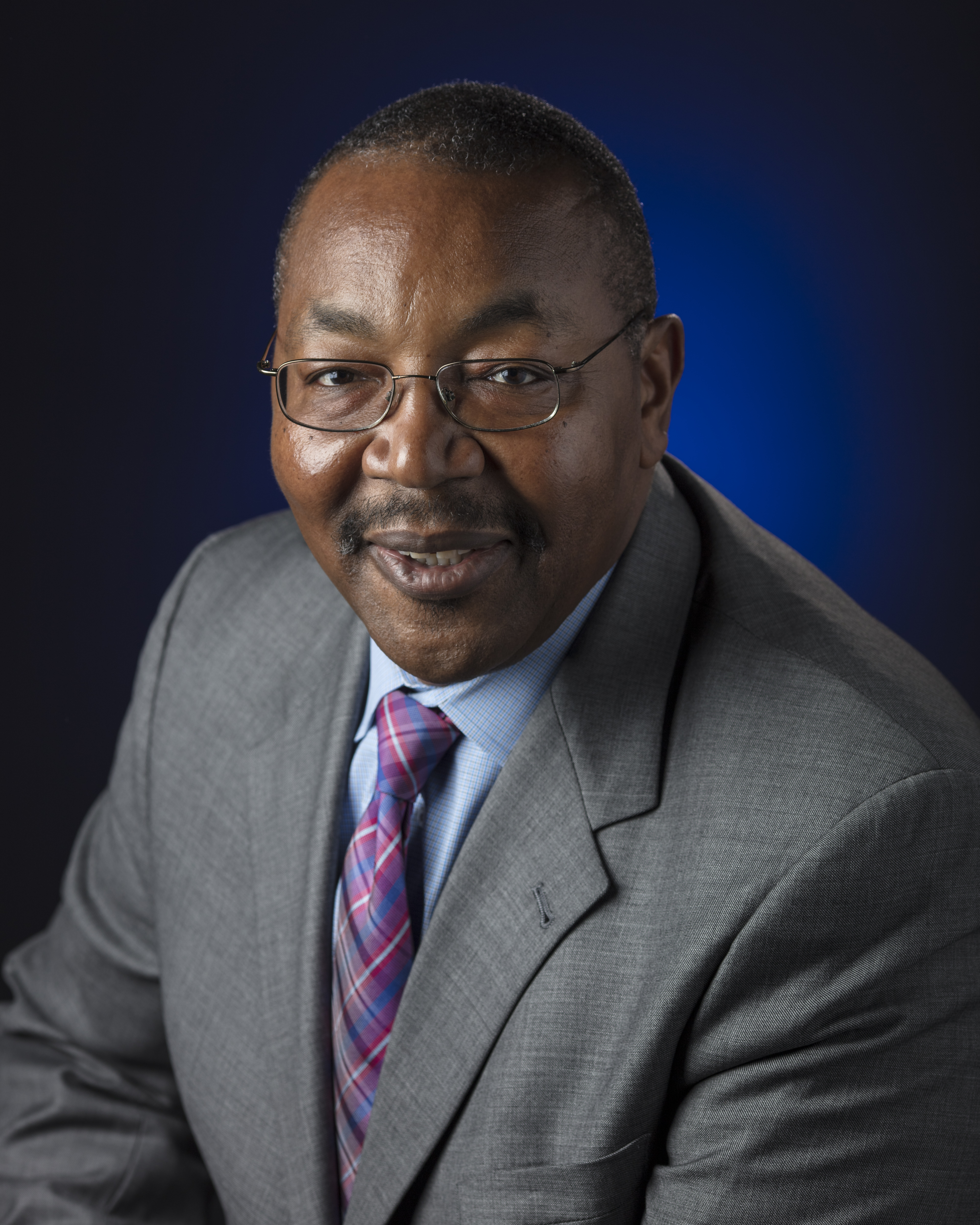
- Official portrait, 2018
- Born: 1960; Danville, Virginia, U.S.
- Education: Averett University, M.B.A; Howard University, B.S. Virginia Union University, B.S.
- Known for: Program Director of the James Webb Space Telescope
- Scientific career
- Workplaces: NASA

Gregory L. Robinson is an American engineer and the former director of the James Webb Space Telescope Program at NASA.

== Early life ==
Robinson was the 9th of 11 children born to tobacco sharecroppers in rural Virginia. He attended a segregated elementary school until 1970, then attended Dan River High School, where he graduated in 1978.

== Education ==
Robinson received a full-ride football scholarship to Virginia Union University, where he obtained a bachelor's degree in mathematics. He then transferred to Howard University and earned a bachelor's degree in electrical engineering. Robinson also has an MBA from Averett College. He later attended the Harvard Kennedy School as a Senior Executive Fellow.

== Career ==
Robinson joined NASA in 1989, and quickly became a manager at the Goddard Space Flight Center. He has been Deputy Center Director of the John H. Glenn Research Center, where he oversaw 114 missions, from 2005 to 2013 was the NASA Deputy Chief Engineer, and from 2018 to 2022, was the director of the Webb Space Telescope Program. As the director of the Webb Telescope Program, he oversaw the program that included over 20,000 people, and he successfully saw the launch of the telescope which had been delayed many times before Robinson took over the project. He has also taught in the George Washington University Department of Engineering Management & Systems Engineering.

For his role in improving the performance of the Webb program, Robinson's supervisor, Thomas Zurbuchen, called him "the most effective leader of a mission I have ever seen in the history of NASA." Zurbuchen credited Robinson with raising the program's schedule efficiency (how many measures were completed on time) from 50% to 95%. In 2022, Robinson was named to the Time 100 list of influential people, as well as Time Innovator of the Year in 2022. In July 2022, after Webb's commissioning process was complete and it began transmitting its first data, Robinson retired, following a 33-year career at NASA.

Since 2020, Robinson has taught at Columbia University.

== Awards ==
Robinson received many awards and accolades for his work as the director of the James Webb Space Telescope Program including:

- 2013: NASA Presidential Rank Distinguished Executive Award
- 2022: Federal Employee of the Year (Samuel J. Heyman Service to America Medals)
- 2022: Time 100 Most Influential People of 2022
- 2022: Time 2022 Innovator of the Year
- 2022: EBONY Power 100
- 2022: NASA Presidential Rank Distinguished Executive Award
- 2023: Stibitz-Wilson Award from the American Computer & Robotics Museum
- 2025: Honorary Doctor of Science from Rochester Institute of Technology

== Personal life ==
Robinson and his wife, Cynthia, have three daughters and several grandchildren.
