= DCMTK =

Software libraries for medical data

- Developer: OFFIS
- Written in: C and C++
- Standard: DICOM
- Type: Medical software
- License: 3-clause BSD
- Website: dicom.offis.de/en/dcmtk
- Repository: git.dcmtk.org

The DICOM Toolkit (DCMTK) is a collection of software libraries and utilities that implement the DICOM standard. It is primarily developed by the German organization OFFIS.
