= Apple Museum, Prague =

Former museum in Prague

Apple Museum
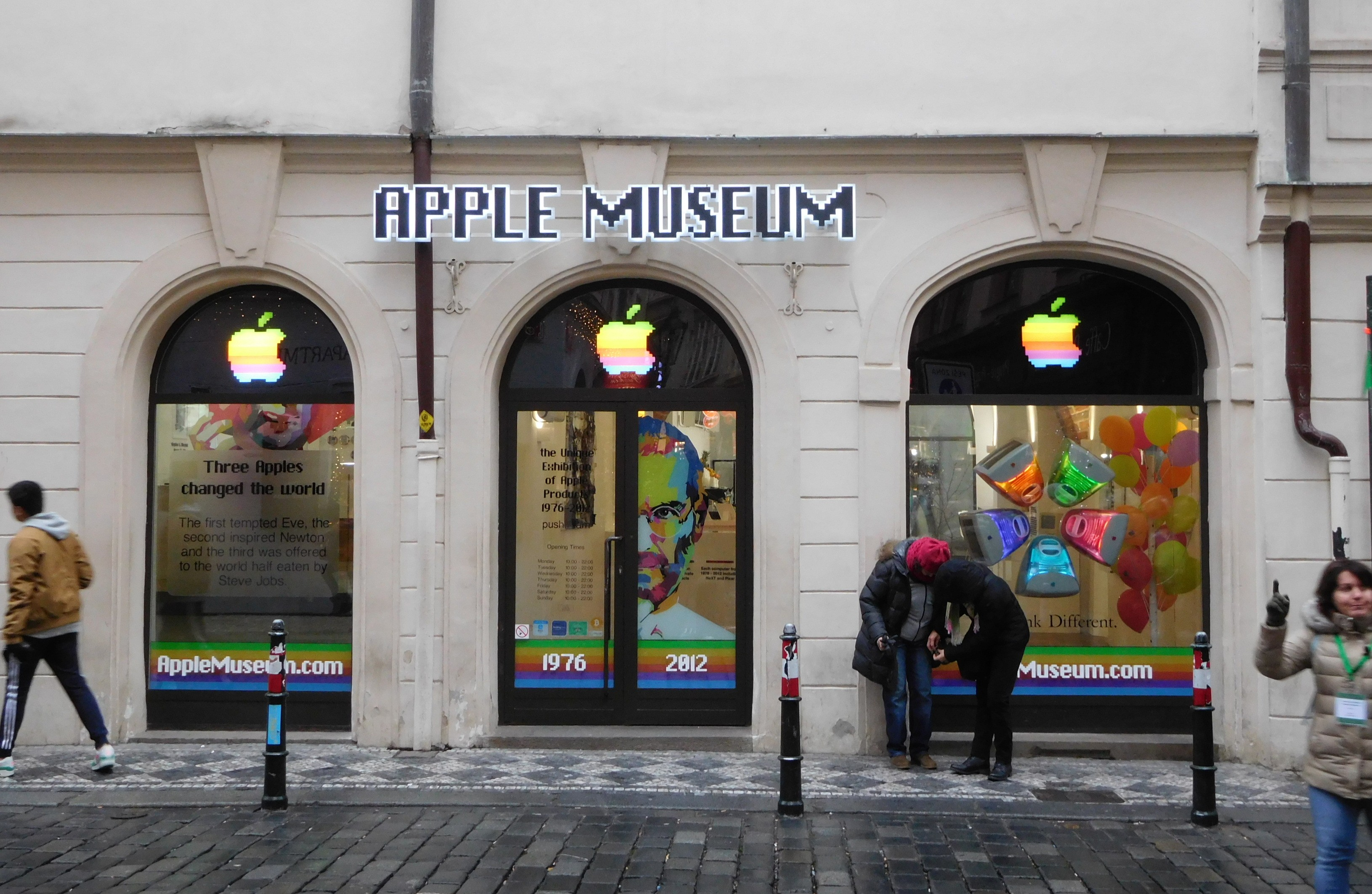
- Established: December 2015
- Dissolved: September 2020
- Location: Husova 156/21, Prague, Czech Republic
- Coordinates: 50°5′9.6″N 14°25′4.7″E

The Apple Museum was a museum located in Old Town, Prague, Czech Republic. It showcased a collection of Apple memorabilia and products, and featured numerous visual and audio tributes to Steve Jobs. The collection included nearly every Apple product ever created. The museum was permanently closed in September 2020.

== History ==
The Apple Museum was established in 2015. At the time, entry cost €11 ($12.2), with all proceeds "donated to charity purposes." The museum featured approximately 472 exhibits, which it described as the largest private collection of its kind. The collection included nearly every Apple product ever created, along with personal items such as Steve Jobs' business cards from his tenure at NeXT and Pixar. The museum was located across three buildings in Prague's historic Old Town. It originated from the personal collection of its owner, an Apple enthusiast.

In April 2020, the museum announced plans to create a replica of Steve Jobs’ garage, featuring an augmented reality guide.

=== Closure ===
In July 2020, Prague businessman Miloslav Žáček reported a robbery of Apple Museum. Several days later, police discovered the majority of the collection in a former nuclear shelter on the outskirts of Prague. The exhibits, contained in nearly one hundred boxes, had been hidden by Sandra Pokorná, the former director of the museum and Žáček’s then-partner, within the premises of her father's company. Pokorná had also served as the head of the Art 21 Foundation, which operated the museum.

In September 2020, the museum was permanently closed. It had been closed for several weeks, with many speculating that the closure was due to the COVID-19 pandemic. According to the museum, the collection was shut down after all the exhibited items were allegedly stolen. The museum suggested that internal disputes within the organization might have contributed to the disappearance of the exhibits.

== Exhibits ==
Apple Museum showcased a collection of Apple memorabilia and products, beginning with the Apple I, a bare circuit board released in 1976, and including notable items such as the iMac. It also featured the 1997 "Think Different" ad campaign, displaying a wall of portraits honoring its celebrated figures. The museum featured numerous visual and audio tributes to Steve Jobs, including a portrait of Jobs created from components of six iMac G3 computers, a product line manufactured between 1998 and 2003, replicas of his motorcycle and his clothing, and a recreation of Banksy's The Son of a Migrant from Syria, reinterpreted with Jobs depicted as a migrant, referencing his father’s Syrian heritage. Audio recordings of Jobs' keynote speeches from Macworld conventions accompanied a display of Apple products over the years. The museum's CEO expressed that it aimed to convey "what it was he [Jobs] was driving at."

In 2020, the museum's CEO claimed that most visitors were men in their 30s, and that some Apple executives from California had toured the space.

== Reception ==
Walt Mossberg remarked that even Apple itself did not possess such a valuable collection and that the museum contained exceptional pieces.

== See also ==
- List of museums in Prague
- The Apple Museum - a similar museum in Utrecht, Netherlands.
