= IT 8-bit =

Computer museum in Mariupol, Ukraine

Coordinates: 47°05′41″N 37°32′44″E

IT 8-bit was a computer museum in Mariupol, Ukraine. Founded by Dmitry Cherepanov, it was one of the largest privately owned computer museums in Ukraine prior to its destruction. The museum opened in August 2016.

The museum's collection included numerous computers from the Soviet Union.

The building housing the museum, which held more than 500 exhibits, was destroyed during the Siege of Mariupol in the 2022 Russian invasion of Ukraine.
