= Eldon C. Hall =

American computer scientist

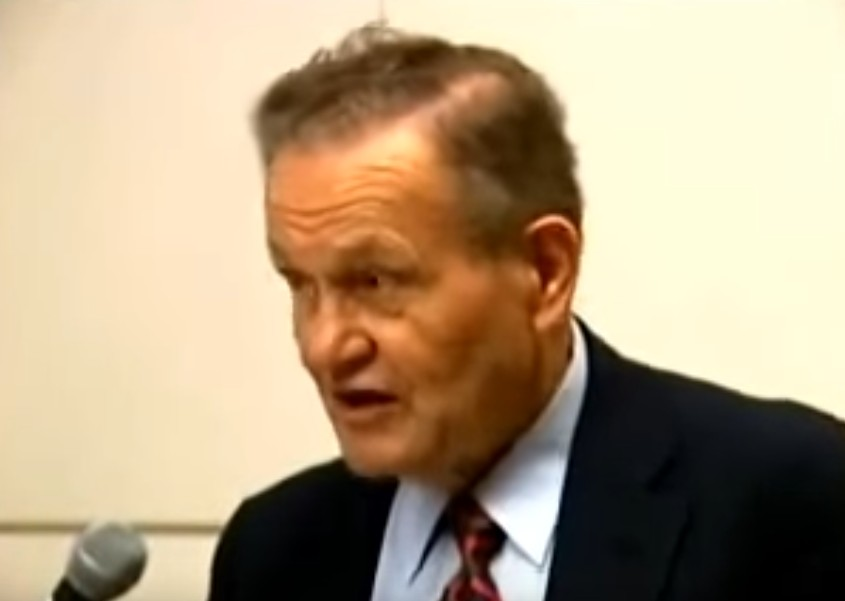
- Eldon C. Hall, 2004
- Born: Eldon Conrad Hall; June 15, 1923; Payette, Idaho, United States
- Died: May 25, 2022 (aged 98)
- Education: University of Washington, Rutgers University, Eastern Nazarene College, Boston University (Masters Degree), Massachusetts Institute of Technology, and Harvard University (doctoral program in physics)
- Occupation: Computer engineering
- Known for: Leader of hardware design efforts for the Apollo Guidance Computer
- Spouse: Grace White (m. 1948)
- Children: 4
- Parent(s): William Baker Hall and Elsie Nodle Hall

Eldon Hall was the leader of hardware design efforts for the Apollo Guidance Computer (AGC) at MIT, and advocated the use of integrated circuits for this task. He wrote extensively of the development of the AGC, culminating in his 1996 book, Journey to the Moon: The History of the Apollo Guidance Computer (ISBN 1-56347-185-X)

He pursued his undergraduate education at the Eastern Nazarene College in Quincy, Massachusetts, his graduate education at Boston University, and his doctoral degree at Harvard University (though he did not complete the PhD).

== Awards ==
- 1997: Stibitz-Wilson Award from the American Computer & Robotics Museum

== Publications ==
- Eldon C. Hall (2000). From the Farm to Pioneering with Digital Computers: An Autobiography.
- Eldon C. Hall (1996). Journey to the Moon: The History of the Apollo Guidance Computer
