= Retro Computer Museum =

Museum in Leicester, England

- Established: July 2008
- Location: Thurmaston, Leicestershire
- Coordinates: 52.664187°N 1.089782°W
- Type: Computer museum
- Collection size: ~300 (unique) systems, >40000 software titles
- Founder: Andy Spencer
- Chairperson: Andy Spencer
- Parking: On site (no charge)
- Website: Official website

The Retro Computer Museum (RCM) is a museum in Leicester, England dedicated to the benefit of the public for the preservation, display, and public experience of computer and console systems from the 1960s onwards.

== Overview ==
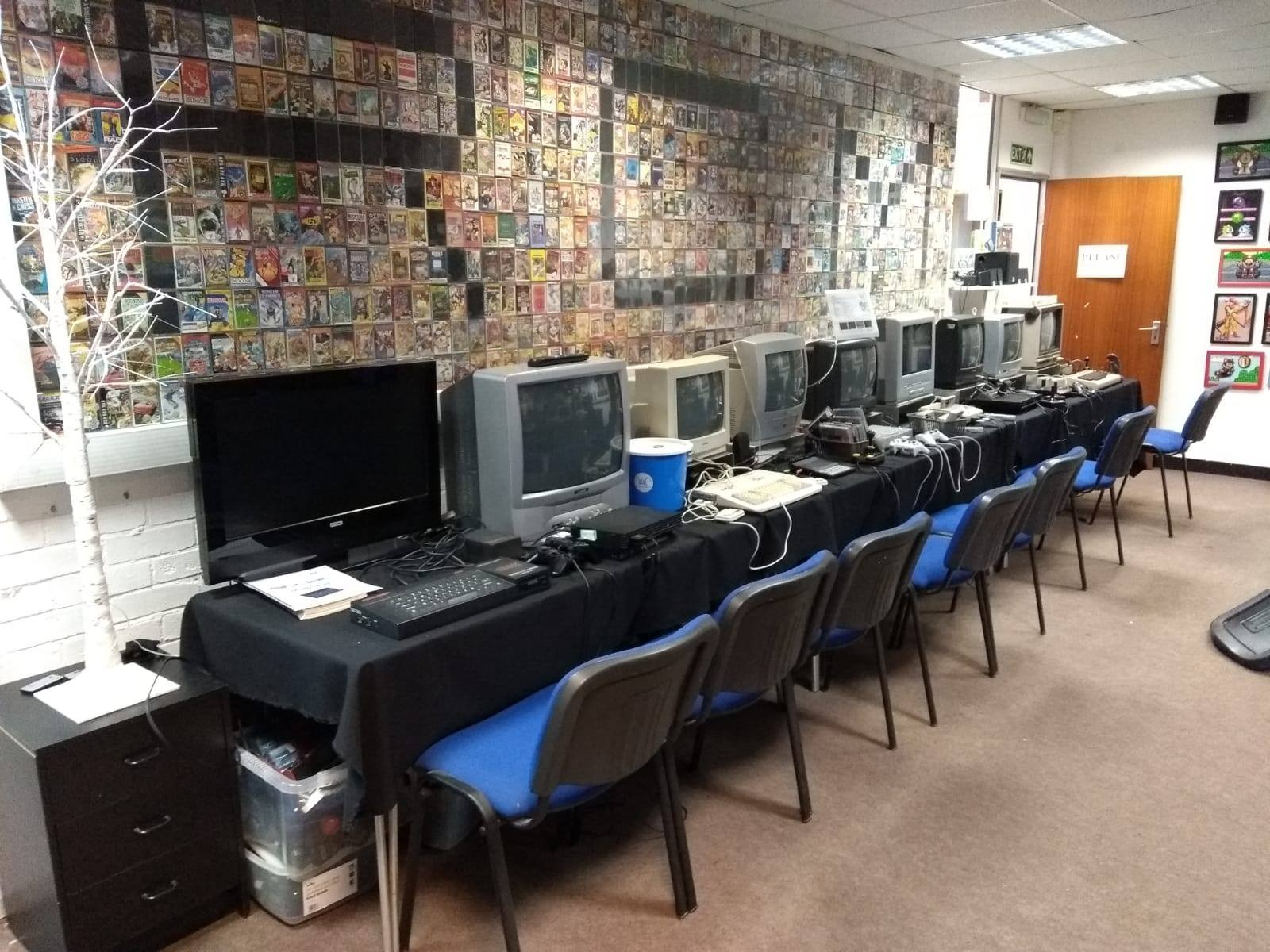
Part of the museum's main room

The museum is a registered charity, and staffed entirely by volunteers. The museum is run by a board of trustees chaired by Andy Spencer, the founder of the museum. On display are a number of computers and consoles from throughout history, from the early home consoles such as the Atari 2600, more advanced machines like the ZX Spectrum, Commodore 64, and NES, through to more recent consoles like the GameCube, PlayStation 2, and Xbox. A number of rarer items are also on display.

The collection is built largely on donations by the public, and the museum holds around 300 unique systems. Over 40 systems are on display to the public and may be freely used for gaming or, for users with existing knowledge, programming, as well as a public software library holding around 40000 titles. The museum also holds a large collection of magazines and manuals, which are also available to the public.

The museum is open to the public on most Saturdays and Sundays from 10am to 3:30pm, as well as offering private events (such as parties and school visits) at the main building in Leicester or other premises. The museum also attends other retro gaming and computing events, often providing systems for use by other attendees.

== History ==
The museum began as Andy Spencer's personal collection, which eventually outgrew his garage and became the Retro Computer Museum. The museum first opened to the public in 2008, with an open day held in Swannington, Leicestershire on 16 November 2008. Several more events were held over the following years, both at the original location in Swannington and other venues.

In 2011, the museum moved into its first permanent building in Heather, Leicestershire. Several open days and events were held here. In 2013, the museum moved to larger premises at Troon Way Business Centre in Thurmaston, where it remains (in a different building). In 2016, the museum moved to a larger building in Troon Way, where it currently remains. The museum was moved over less than two weeks in January 2016, and reopened shortly after.
