= Rebecca D. Costa =

American sociobiologist, futurist and author

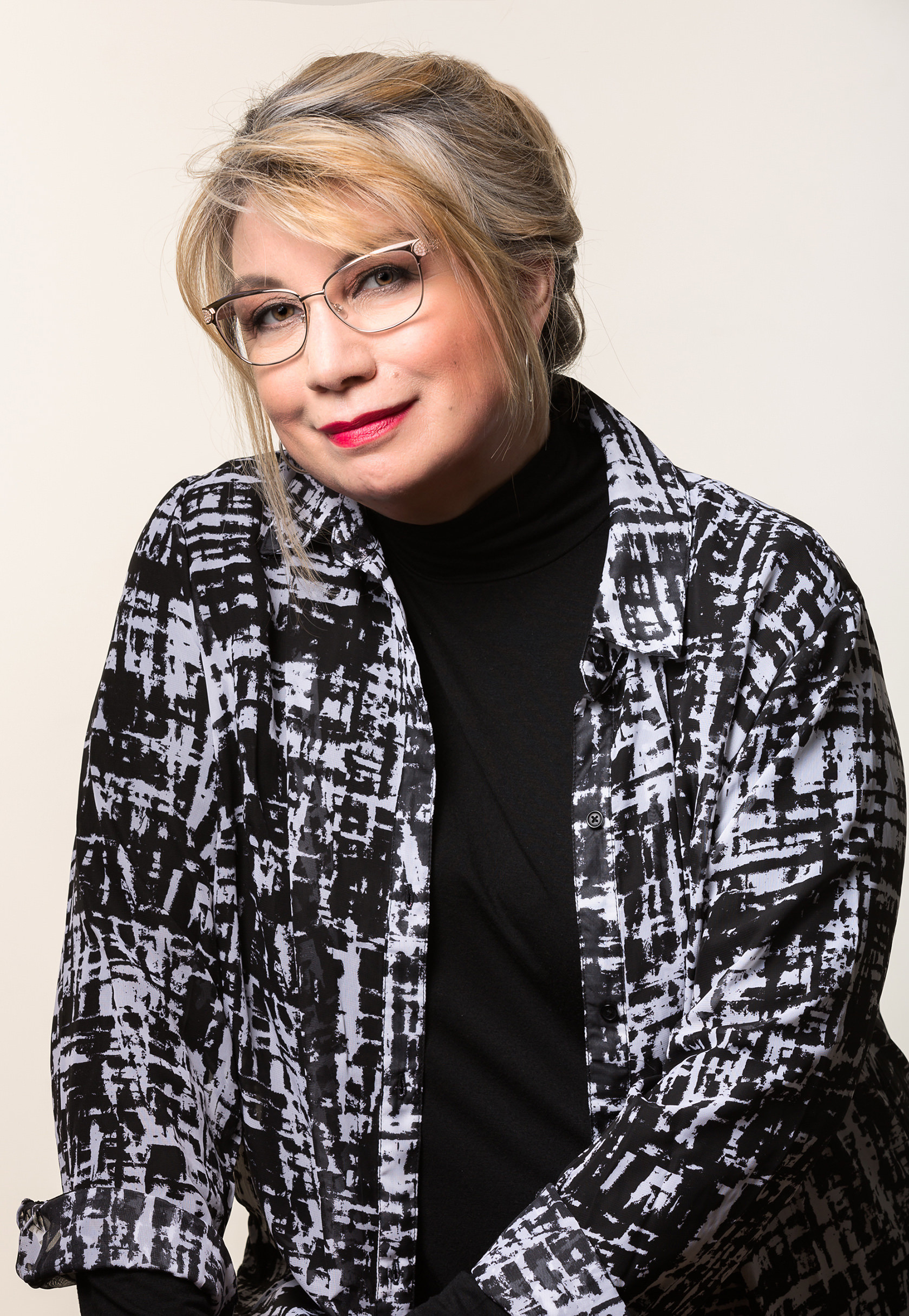
- Born: Rebecca Dazai Costa; April 11, 1955 (age 71); San Mateo, California, United States
- Education: University of California, Santa Barbara
- Occupations: Sociobiologist, Futurist, Author
- Website: www.rebeccacosta.com

Rebecca Dazai Costa (born April 11, 1955) is an American sociobiologist, futurist, and author. She is an expert in the field of fast adaptation. Costa is widely known for her controversial book, The Watchman's Rattle, which offers an evolutionary explanation for modern problems such as government gridlock, terrorism, addiction, a decline in education, etc. National Public Radio's EarthSky said, "Rebecca Costa is a sociobiologist who spots and explains emerging trends in relationship to human evolution, global markets, and new technologies." Her work has been featured in The New York Times, USA Today, Washington Post, and Larry King Live. Costa is the recipient of the Edward O. Wilson Biodiversity Technology Award.

== The Watchman's Rattle ==
On October 12, 2010, Vanguard Press, a division of Perseus Books Group, Inc., published Costa's book: The Watchman's Rattle. Acclaimed Harvard University naturalist, Edward O. Wilson, contributed the foreword to the book. The Watchman's Rattle received critical acclaim from Richard Branson, Dr. James Watson, Donald Trump, Bill Bradley, and others. The book earned a "Highly Recommend" by the New York Journal of Books, and The New York Times speculated whether Costa would be "Oprah's Next Star." Media Partner of ABC Television Group, GreenRightNow.com recognized The Watchman's Rattle as one of the best "green" books of 2010. Bart Alexander, Chief Corporate Responsibility Officer for Molson Coors, said that The Watchman's Rattle "is a wakeup call book about what political, economic, and social challenges the world may be facing." Inc. Magazine said The Watchman's Rattle is "a fascinating study on how the brain works and how, in the face of complex challenges, our society can survive despite our intelligence being outpaced by our problems." The book was distributed in 20 countries. In November 2012, the paperback edition of The Watchman's Rattle was released by Perseus Books Group, Inc.

== On the Verge ==
On September 6, 2017, Costa's book On the Verge was published by RosettaBooks. The book examines the role predictive analytics and human foresight play in "pre-dapting" to future events. The book received critical reviews from Jim Lehrer, Alan Dershowitz, Senate Majority Leader, George Mitchell, John Sculley, Christine Todd Whitman, Tom Daschle, Craig Newmark, Governor Bill Richardson, and others.

== The Costa Report ==
The success of The Watchman's Rattle led to a nationally syndicated weekly radio news program called The Costa Report in 2011. The program was praised for its nonpartisan coverage. Newsmakers ranging from Vice President Walter Mondale and theoretical physicist Michio Kaku, to former Secretary of Defense, Leon Panetta, Bob Woodward, George Schultz, and Steve Forbes appeared as guests on The Costa Report. The program was syndicated by the Genesis Communications Network (GCN) and VoiceAmerica. The final episode of The Costa Report aired January 4, 2018.

== Television ==
In 2011, Costa agreed to host an internet television program on the emPOWERmetv Network. The program was titled Countermeasures, with host Rebecca Costa, and was loosely based on The Costa Report radio show. Following an 8-episode pilot, Costa was offered a contract for a full season, but declined stating "The time needed to research, write, and oversee a weekly television program is more than my schedule can accommodate."

== Public speaking ==
In 2012, Costa joined the American Program Bureau (APB). She is a popular public speaker at business, healthcare, education, government and technology conferences. Executive Director of the Center for Homeland Defense and Security said "Rebecca Costa blew us away with her socio-biological explanation of how our complex environment drives humans into gridlock and indecision. She artfully connects the dots from genetics to complexity to evolution to gridlock." Executive Vice President of Abbott Laboratories, John Landgraf said, "(Costa) really made me stop and think about our business in a different light." Costa has been a speaker at Dole Food Company, IBM, Walmart, NASCIO, Abbott Laboratories, Big Data Alliance, American Association of State Colleges and Universities, Tableau Software, National Retail Federation, G20 Summit, North American Spine Society, Colorado Health Symposium, etc.

== Personal life ==
Rebecca Costa lives on the coast of the Pacific Northwest. She has two children by marriage. She is an enthusiastic supporter of the Boys and Girls Club, American Red Cross, and Habitat for Humanity.
