= Gary Strobel =

American microbiologist and naturalist (born 1938)

Gary A. Strobel (born September 23, 1938) is an American microbiologist and naturalist. He was co-contributor to the discovery that somaclonal variation occurs in plants and can be used for plant improvement. The discovery of the R_{i} plasmid in Agrobacterium rhizogenes also originated in his laboratory. He examined endophytic fungi and bacteria for their novel bioactive compounds and their unique biology. Forbes magazine called him the "Indiana Jones of fungus hunters" for his expeditions, collections, and research into fungi.

== Early life and education ==
Strobel was born and raised in Massillon, Ohio. He completed a B.S. degree at Colorado State University in 1960, and a PhD at the University of California, Davis in 1963.

== Academic career ==
He has been on the faculty of Montana State University - Bozeman since 1970, earning the title of professor emeritus of plant pathology on September 30, 2005. His research and academic interests have centered on microbe – higher plant relationships. His work on the modification of tree microflora to preclude plant disease received major national attention in his efforts to biologically control Dutch elm disease.

Strobel has lectured at over 350 institutes and universities worldwide and published over 350 articles in scientific journals and holds nearly 50 USA and International patents. From 1979 to 2000 he was chief of the Montana NSF Experimental Program to Stimulate Competitive Research (EPSCoR) program which encourages and promotes science at all levels of society.

== Endophytes ==
Strobel has embarked on collection trips and research into the use of endophytes for various applications. He has licensed more than 20 specimens to pharmaceutical and chemical companies, and his discoveries have included a specimen that grows on the Yew tree that produces taxol, one that produces a fumigant, and another that produces volatile gases (hydrocarbons). The amount of gas produced relative to the food inputs is much lower for the endophyte than other biodiesel production methods, but research into bioengineering the biodiesel production traits into fast reproducing yeast is ongoing.

== Controversy ==
Strobel was reprimanded by the EPA in 1987 for injecting genetically altered bacteria into American elms. At that time it became known that, three years previously, he had developed and released another genetically engineered microbe into the wild without requesting permission from the government, a "clear violation of Federal guidelines in effect at the time."

== Awards and memberships ==
- NIH Career Development award
- Wiley award
- Special recognition from the Royal Nepal Chemical Society
- Elected to membership in the American Society for Microbiology
- Member of The Explorers Club.

== Personal life ==
His son, Scott Strobel, is a professor at Yale University.

== See also ==
- Commercialization of traditional medicines
