= Nexon Computer Museum =

Computer museum in Jeju City, South Korea

Coordinates: 33.4721°N 126.4860°E

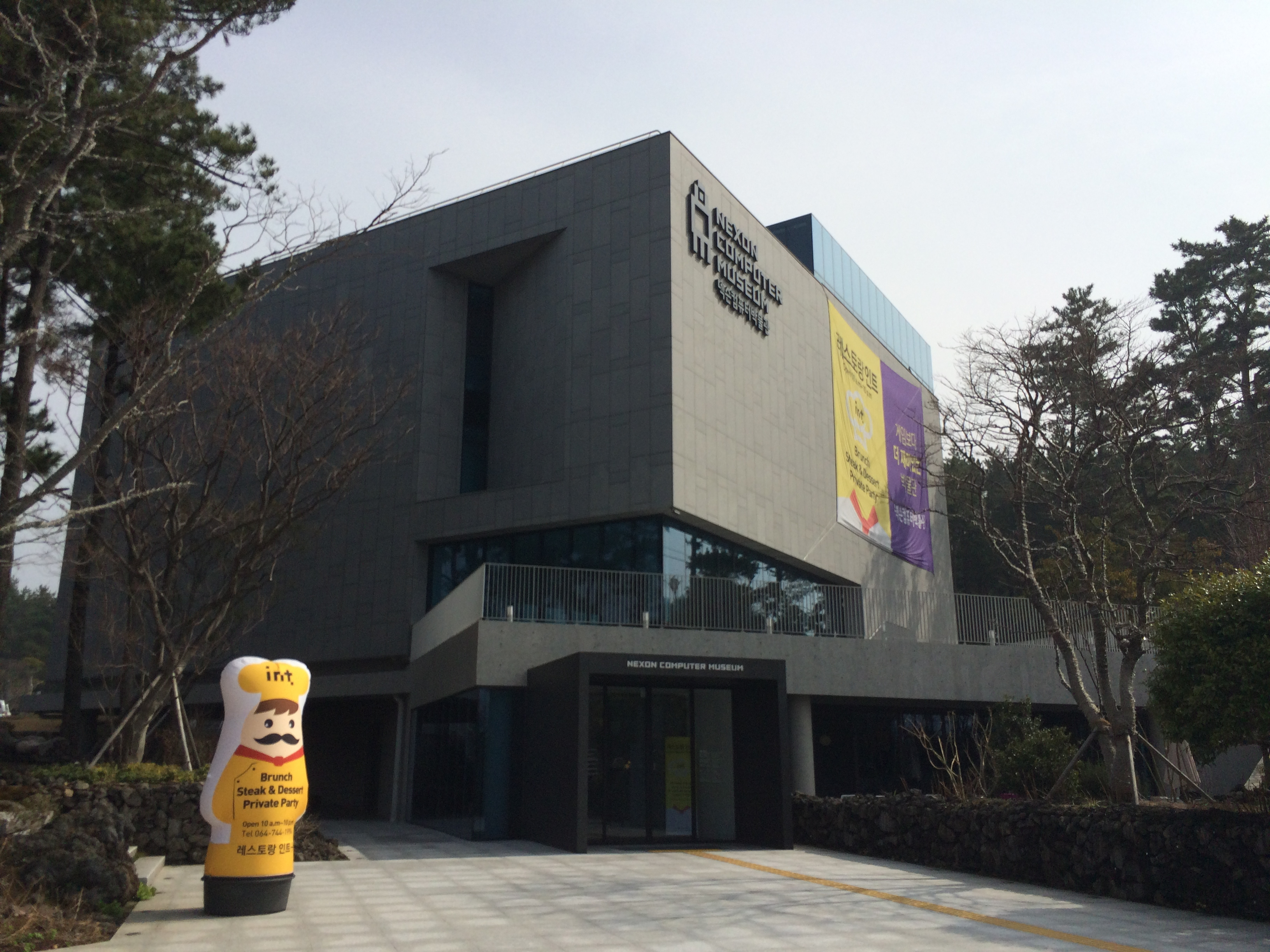
- Established: 2013; 13 years ago
- Location: Jeju City, Jeju Province, South Korea
- Website: computermuseum.nexon.com

The Nexon Computer Museum (Korean: 넥슨컴퓨터박물관) is a museum in Jeju City in South Korea. Opening on 27 July 2013, it is one of the first permanent museums in Korea that is dedicated to the history of computers and video games.

As of 2017, the museum houses 6,900 items, including personal computers, video game consoles, arcades, and software. The museum's supporters include institutions such as Computerspielemuseum Berlin and International Center for the History of Electronic Games, and companies such as Nexon, Softmax, Gamevil, Oculus VR, Thalmic Labs, Take-Two Interactive, and Sony Computer Entertainment. The museum's goals include collecting, preserving, and exhibiting historic digital artifacts.

== Structure ==
The Nexon Computer Museum exhibits an original Apple I. Purchased from Sotheby's on 15 June 2012 for US$374,500, the museum's Apple I is one of only six that are still fully operational. This Apple I successfully operated in 2010, and in 2013. Video footage of it operating in 2013 was shown at G-Star in 2013, as part of the Nexon Computer Museum's moving exhibition PC Road Show. Their collection also includes an original Altair 8800, Commodore PET, IBM Personal Computer and classic Korean computers such as Zemix V, SPC-1500A, IQ-1000, FC-100D that were developed or distributed by Samsung, Daewoo, and Goldstar (now LG). The museum also provides several gaming software available for visitors to play, such as Space Invaders, Galaga, Prince of Persia, Hanme-Type Writing Teacher. It also offers various education programs to local communities.

- 1st floor: Welcome Stage "Computer as Theatre" – concentrates on the history of personal computers
- 2nd floor: Open Stage "Between Reality and Fantasy" – concentrates on the history of video games and next-gen technologies
- 3rd floor: Hidden Stage "The Real Revolution" – concentrates on education programs and open source based inventions
- B1 floor: Special Stage "Crazy Arcade" – concentrates on the history of arcade games

== Projects ==
The museum aims to research and archive MMO games. In 2014, Nexon Computer Museum restored and preserved the earliest version (dating to 1996) of graphical MMORPG Kingdom of Winds, which is also available to play online. In addition, it provides regional education program such as 'NCM Kids Panel', 'Integrated Kids Workshop HAT', and 'Open Workshop'.

On 17 June 2015, the museum released its '360 Virtual Museum', which offers a virtual tour of the Nexon Computer Museum's collection.

On 6 April 2016, the free mobile application 'NCM Mobile Application' was launched for both iOS and Android, which allows users to look for and share pictures and information of 440 major artifacts.

From April to November 2016, Nexon Computer Museum held its first on-going Virtual Reality contents festival ‘2016 NCM VR OPEN CALL’ to raise public interest in Virtual Reality and support new challenges of content creators. Six awardees were chosen among 58 works in various genres including travel, horror, fairy tale and education. With an award of ₩5 million, all winners had the opportunity to have a 'Develop Week and Artist Talk' program with an independent exhibition in Nexon Computer Museum VR zone. The winners also had a special pop-up museum exhibition at Nexon Korea building at Pan-gyo, South Korea.

On 3 November 2016, Nexon Computer Museum commissioned the winners of 2016 NCM VR OPEN CALL as 2017 NCM Accelerator: VR Project to support further contents development of the artists. Nexon Computer Museum will fund each team from ₩500,000 to ₩1 million per month along with international exhibition, networking and mentoring for a year. Starting from 2016 NCM VR OPEN CALL, Nexon Computer Museum hopes to be a stable companion of the artists to mount new challenges.

== History ==
Nexon Computer Museum opened on 27 July 2013.

- Restored the earliest version of graphical MMORPG Kingdom of Winds on 27 May 2014.
- Museum Remark: Keyboard & Mouse exhibition since 19 July 2014.
- 360 Virtual Museum since 17 June 2015.
- 'NCM Mobile Application' launched 6 April 2016
- '2016 NCM VR OPEN CALL' from April to November, 2016
