= Music and Medicine =

- Discipline: Music, medicine
- Language: English
- Edited by: Joanne V. Loewy, Ralph Spintge

Publication details
- History: 2009-present
- Publisher: International Association for Music and Medicine
- Frequency: Quarterly

Standard abbreviations
- ISO 4: Music Med.

Indexing
- ISSN: 1943-863X
- LCCN: 2008203949
- OCLC no.: 262835201

Links
- Journal homepage; Online access; Online archives (2014-present); Online archives (2009-2013)

Music and Medicine is a quarterly peer-reviewed academic journal that covers research on the intersection of music and medicine. Its editors-in-chief are Joanne V. Loewy (Mount Sinai Beth Israel) and Ralph Spintge (Sportkrankenhaus Hellersen). It was established in 2009 and originally published by SAGE Publications. As of 2014 it is published by the International Association for Music and Medicine.

== Abstracting and indexing ==
The journal is abstracted and indexed in CINAHL and PsycINFO.
