= The Apple Museum =

Museum in Utrecht, Netherlands

- Established: 1 April 2026
- Location: The Wall shopping centre, Utrecht, Netherlands
- Type: Technology museum
- Owner: Stichting The Apple Museum
- Website: Official website

The Apple Museum is a museum in Utrecht, the Netherlands, devoted to the history and products of Apple Inc. It opened on 1 April 2026, coinciding with the 50th anniversary of Apple, and opened to the public on 2 April.

== History ==
In an interview on BNR Nieuwsradio's De Grote Tech Show, Bindels explained that the museum had been several years in the making and was created to present Apple's complete history as a coherent museum narrative.The museum grew out of a private collection of Apple products and memorabilia assembled over a period of years. It was initiated by entrepreneur Ed Bindels, founder of the Dutch Apple reseller Amac.

The official opening took place on 1 April 2026, the fiftieth anniversary of the founding of Apple. The museum is located in The Wall, a shopping centre in Utrecht. The museum is managed by Stichting The Apple Museum, and is not affiliated with Apple Inc.

== Collection ==
The collection includes Apple products from different periods in the company's history, including early computers, Macintosh models, iPods, iPhones and related accessories. The museum supervises a collection of 5,000 potential exhibits, however not all of them are on display. Among the items which are exhibited are an Apple Lisa from 1983, a rainbow of iMac G3s from the late 1990s and early 2000s, and one of the early versions of the iPod. There is also a vista of Steve Jobs' garage, part of the Apple historic folklore. Covering approximately 2,000 m^{2} (22,000 sq ft), it has been described as the largest museum devoted to Apple in Europe, with one of the largest collections of Apple products in the world. Some of the museum's restored computers are operational and available for visitors to use.

== See also ==
- Apple Museum, Prague
