= Diana Six =

American forest entomologist and academic

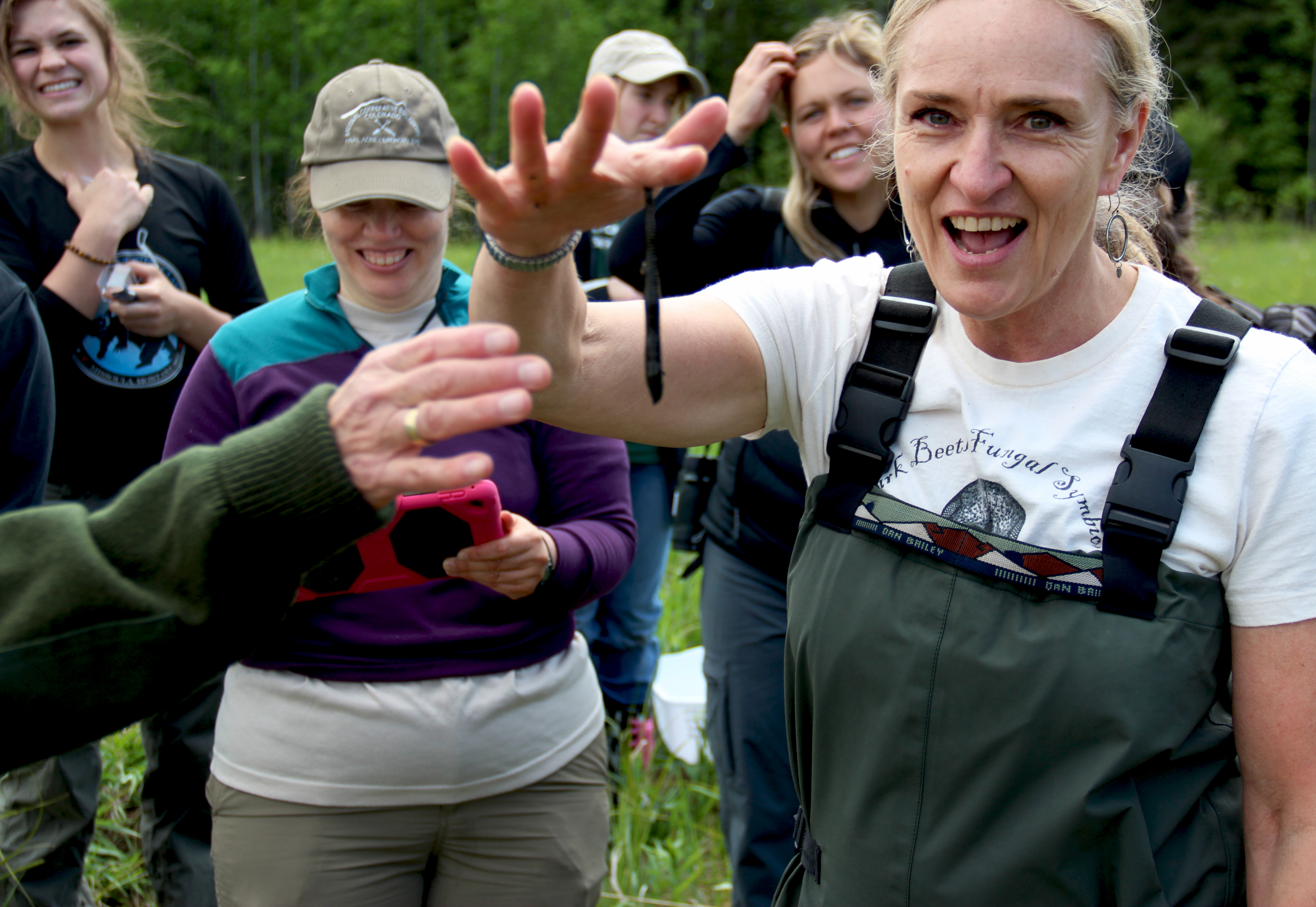
- Education: Cal Poly Pomona, BS (1990) University of California, Riverside, MS, PhD (1997)
- Awards: Edward O. Wilson Biodiversity Technology Pioneer Award
- Scientific career
- Fields: Forest entomology
- Workplaces: University of Montana
- Website: https://www.cfc.umt.edu/research/sixlab/

Diana L. Six is a forest entomologist and professor at the University of Montana. Her research focuses primarily on bark beetle ecology and forest adaptation to climate change. Six is the recipient of the 2018 Edward O. Wilson Biodiversity Technology Pioneer Award, has presented at TEDx, and has been featured in National Geographic among other nationally recognized media.

== Education ==
Six grew up in Upland, California, where she spent her childhood discovering her passion for beetles and fungi through exploring the woods of Southern California. Also growing up with a rough home life, Six initially dropped out of high school. However, she decided to go back, as she graduated from Upland High School, before attending community college.

As a first-generation college student, Diana Six began her higher education at Chaffey College, where she found her passion for science in a biology course she took in her first semester. She earned her Associate of Science Degree in General Microbiology in 1986 before going on to earn her Bachelor of Applied Sciences in Agricultural Biology at Cal Poly Pomona in 1990. While attending University of California Riverside, Six earned her Master of Science in entomology in 1992, and her PhD in entomology (with a mycology minor) in 1997. After earning her PhD, Six was a Postdoctoral Fellow in Chemical Ecology/Entomology at University of California Berkeley.

== Career and research ==
Following her work as a Postdoctoral Researcher at University of California Berkeley, Six became a professor at the University of Montana in 1997, where she has been ever since, teaching Forest Entomology and Pathology. She also serves as the Chair of the University of Montana Department of Ecosystems and Conservation Sciences.

Six has done extensive research on bark beetle ecology and evolution, symbioses of bark beetles and fungi. In addition, she has researched the bark beetle outbreak, along with bark beetles and forests in relation to climate change. Her current research focuses more on bark beetle ecology and management, how forests are responding and adapting to climate change, and looking at the resiliency of different trees through genetics. Six was also funded by the National Park Service and the Climate Science Center (part of the USGS) to research how the ponderosa and whitepark pine are adapting to climate change.

== Awards and recognition ==
In 2018, Six earned the Edward O. Wilson Biodiversity Technology Pioneer Award for her significant and influential contributions to the understanding of bark beetle ecology, biodiversity, and climate change.

== Publications ==
Six has authored and collaborated on over 60 peer-reviewed articles, book chapters, and technical reports that have been published by names such as the Annual Review of Entomology, Annual Review of Ecology, Evolution, and Systematics, Annual Review of Entomology, and Microbial Ecology. Some of her most notable work are as follows:

- The Evolution of Agriculture in Insects, 2005. Annual Review of Ecology, Evolution, and Systematics, Volume 36. https://doi.org/10.1146/annurev.ecolsys.36.102003.152626
- The Role of Phytopathogenicity in Bark Beetle–Fungus Symbioses: A Challenge to the Classic Paradigm, 2011. Annual Review of Entomology, Volume 56. https://doi.org/10.1146/annurev-ento-120709-144839
- Chapter 7: Bark Beetle-Fungus Symbioses, CRC Press, 2003. "Insect symbiosis" edited by Kostas Bourtzis and Thomas A. Miller.
- Ecological and Evolutionary Determinants of Bark Beetle —Fungus Symbioses, 2012. Insects. https://doi.org/10.3390/insects3010339
- Bark Beetle Outbreaks in Western North America: Causes and Consequences, 2009. Bark Beetle Symposium.
- Temperature Determines Symbiont Abundance in a Multipartite Bark Beetle-fungus Ectosymbiosis, 2007. Microbial Ecology. https://doi.org/10.1007/s00248-006-9178-x
- Are Survivors Different? Genetic-Based Selection of Trees by Mountain Pine Beetle During a Climate Change-Driven Outbreak in a High-Elevation Pine Forest, 2018. Frontiers in Plant Science.https://doi.org/10.3389/fpls.2018.00993

== Public engagement ==
In addition to her research, Six often writes pieces for magazines, blogs, also shares her research via twitter, claiming that communicating research to the public is an important component of science, so that its value is better understood.
