= Kiberpipa =

Hackerspace in Ljubljana, Slovenia

- Formation: 2001
- Dissolved: 2015; revival in 2022
- Type: Hackerspace
- Location: Ljubljana
- Website: Kiberpipa homepage

Cyberpipe (Slovene: Kiberpipa) was a hackerspace in Ljubljana, Slovenia, established in 2001 as a part of the K6/4 Institute. After a breakup with the parent organization and moving to a different location in 2013, it ceased most operations in 2015.

The hackerspace operated as a cultural center, computer laboratory, and Internet café (with free wireless access) at Kersnikova 4, Ljubljana. Kiberpipa engaged primarily in open-source programming, electronic art, and the recycling of computer devices. Between 2005 and 2013 it also hosted a small living computer museum.

The mostly volunteer team in the hackerspace organized workshops, lectures, and entertainment and information events, with around 150 events yearly at the height of its activity.

In 2013, the Student Organization of the University of Ljubljana, the owner of the building where Kiberpipa originally operated, decided to re-purpose the building as a restaurant and a parking garage. After failing to negotiate a new position within the organization, Kiberpipa team opted to continue operating independently of the Student Organization and moved to a new location. In the same year, the Student Organization opened its own hackerspace Rampa.

In 2014, Kiberpipa re-opened at a new location at Gosposvetska 2 using volunteer work and donations. It continued to organize lectures and open source software-related events at the new location until closure in 2015. In 2015 a web server malfunction also resulted in the loss of the Kiberpipa website and archived content.

As of December 2022, there is a re-newed effort to revive Cyberpipe with monthly gatherings.

== Partnerships and events ==
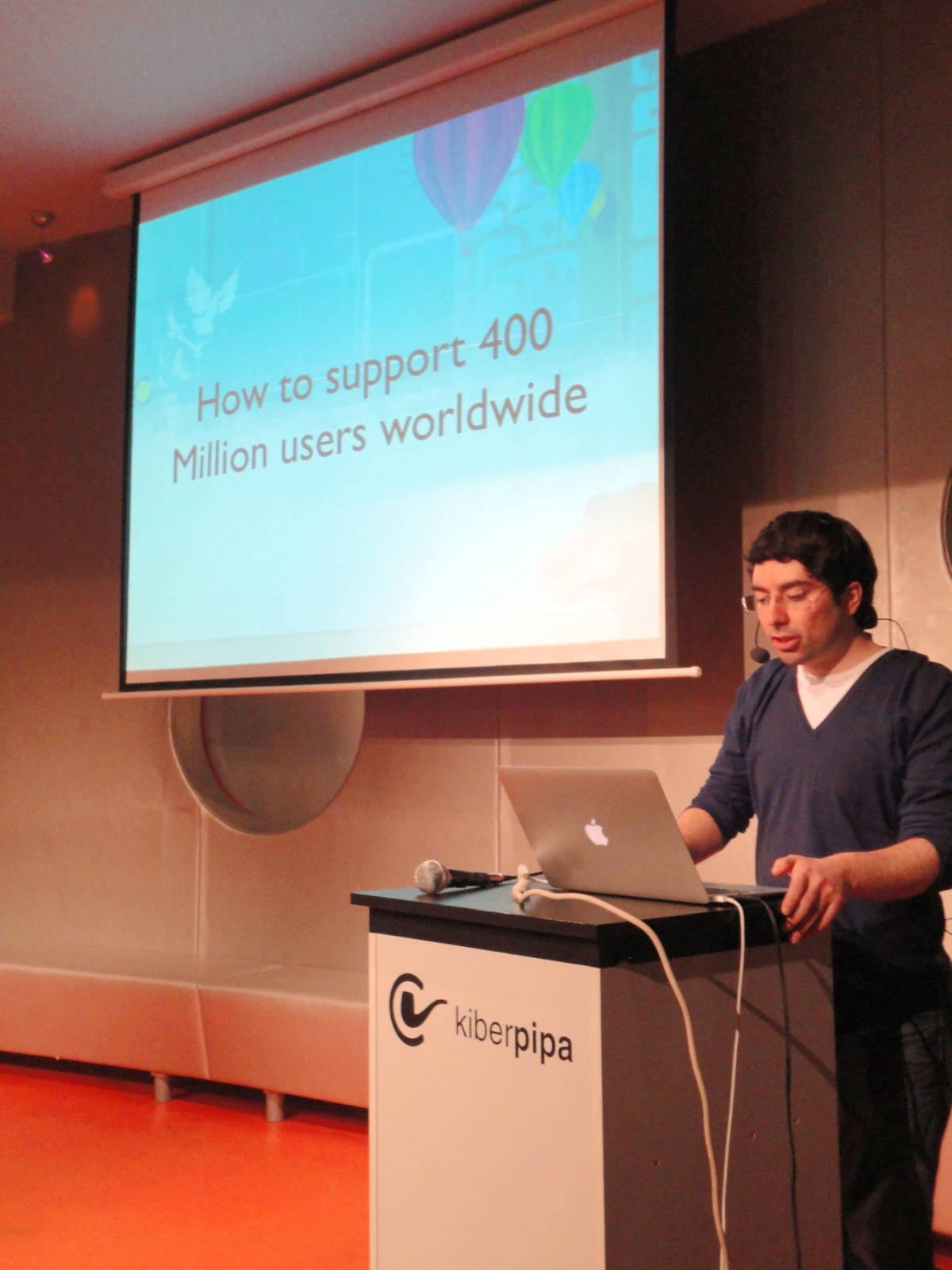
Kiberpipa lecture in 2010

Kiberpipa co-operated with other organizations in Slovenia, e.g. the Slo-Tech and 3delavnica teams, regional multimedia centres (including Ljudmila - Ljubljana Digital Media Lab, KIBLA Multimedia Centre) and organizations abroad (Mama New Media Centre in Zagreb, HackLab in Pula for example).

Kiberpipa organized the bi-annual HAIP Festival (Hack/Act/Interact/Progress Festival).

Kiberpipa was a member of the m3c Multimedia Centres Network of Slovenia.
