= OFFIS =

German research institute

Oldenburger OFFIS - Institut für Informatik

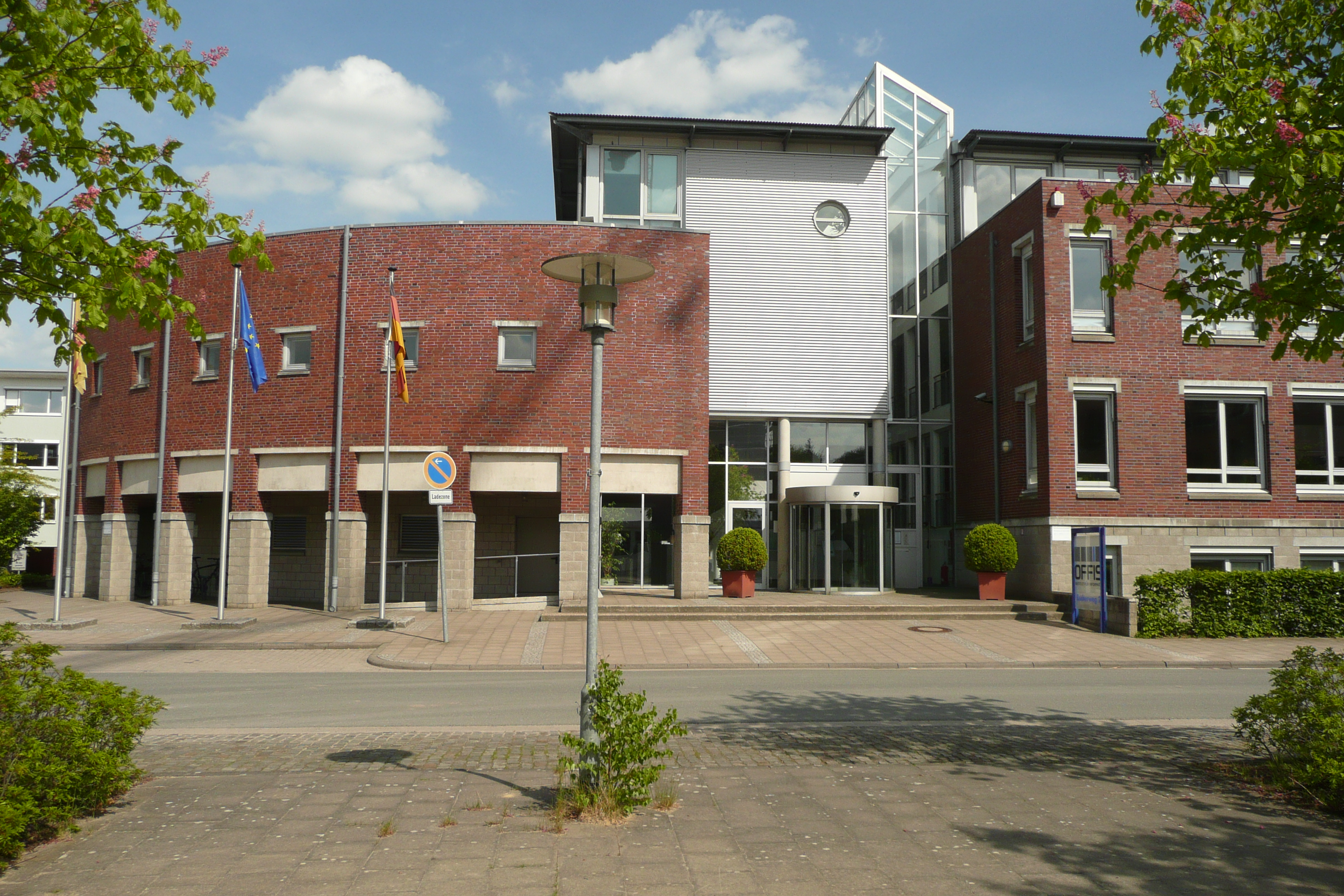
- OFFIS premises in Oldenburg
- Established: 1991
- Location: Oldenburg, Germany
- Website: offis.de

The Oldenburger OFFIS - Institut für Informatik (OFFIS - Institute for Information Technology) is a research institute located in the city of Oldenburg, Germany. The institute was founded on July 6, 1991, and works closely together with the Carl von Ossietzky University of Oldenburg. OFFIS is an application-oriented research and development institute and a center of excellence for selected areas of information technology and its fields of application.

== Organization ==
The institute is divided in four research divisions:

- Energy: energy management and the energy efficiency of digital systems.
- Health: research on enabling humans to live in a condition of full physical, mental, and social well-being.
- Society: technological innovations for a sustainable digital society and the associated design framework in science, business, and politics.
- Manufacturing: transfers its ICT competences for Industry 4.0 from practice-oriented research into the economy so that it can actively participate in shaping the digital transformation.

It also has technology-focused competence clusters:

- Architecture Frameworks (AF)
- Cyber Resilient Architectures and Security (CRAS)
- Deep Learning (DL)
- Embedded System Design (ESD)
- Human Machine Cooperation (HMC)
- Multi-Scale Multi-Rate Simulation (MS²)
- Safety Relevant Cyber-Physical Systems (SRCPS)
- Sustainability

== Projects ==
- DCMTK
