= Enter Technikwelt Solothurn =

Electronics museum in Derendingen, Switzerland

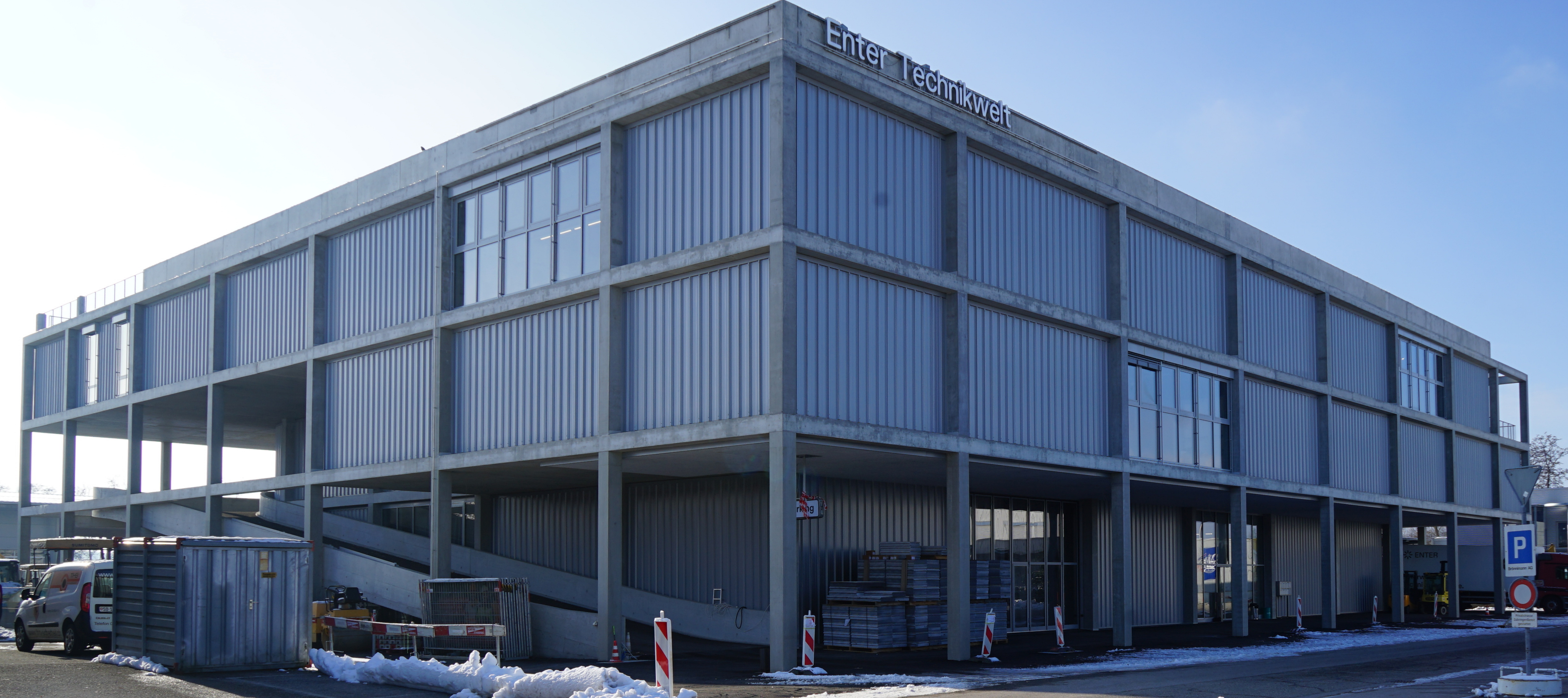
- The Enter Technikwelt Solothurn after reopening in Derendingen in 2023
- Established: 2010; 16 years ago
- Location: Derendingen, Switzerland
- Coordinates: 47°11′49″N 7°35′50″E
- Website: www.enter.ch

Enter Technikwelt Solothurn is a museum for computer and consumer electronics in Derendingen and the largest private technology collection open to the public in Switzerland. Now a non-profit foundation ("Stiftung Enter"), it originated as the project of Swiss entrepreneur Felix Kunz. Originally opening as ENTER Museum in Solothurn in 2011, the museum closed in 2022 and re-opened in 2023 at as Enter Technikwelt Solothurn at a new location in Derendingen.

== History ==
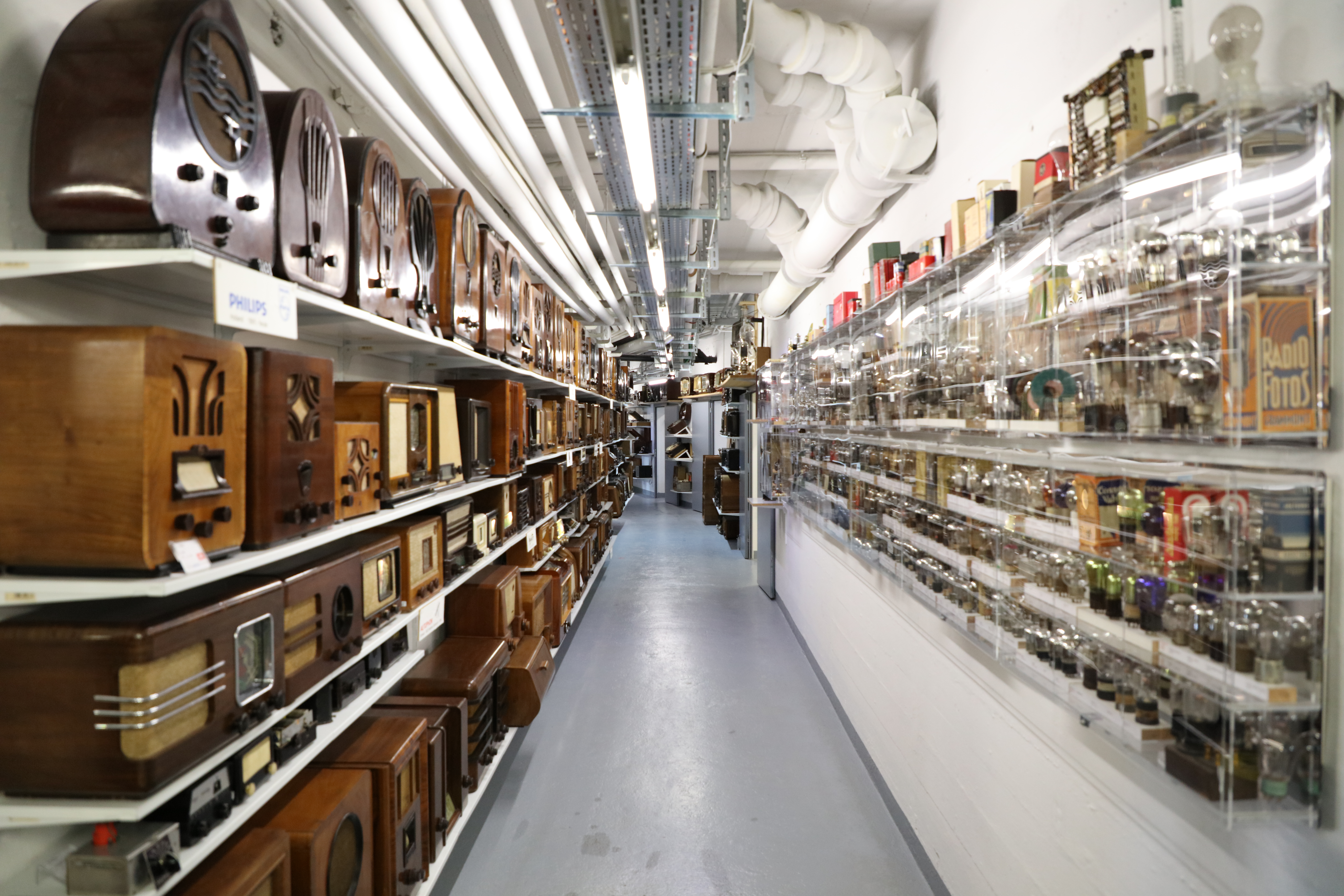
Enter Museum with a display of vintage radios

The museum originated in the private collection of the Swiss entrepreneur Felix Kunz who has been collecting computers and electronics since the mid 1970s. In 2010, Kunz established a foundation for the museum jointly with Peter Regenass, a collector of calculators. In 2011, the Enter museum moved into a building right at the train station in Solothurn with a surface area of 1800 square metres. In 2022, the museum was closed and transferred to the nearby village of Derendingen and re-opened there on a larger scale in 2023, using a surface area of 10,000 square meters.

== Collection ==
The museum displays about 10,000 exhibits from the history of radio, television and computers from the early years to the present.

"What we're seeing here are basically all predecessors to the apps we have on our smartphones today."

— Violetta Vitacca, Museum Director: Transhelvetica

Many of the exhibits were developed and produced in the Solothurn region, e.g. by Autophon or Anton Gunzinger. The collection has a focus on history of technology made in Switzerland with products of Studer-Revox Paillard, Bolex, Crypto AG, Gretag. It also shows the main stages of computer history with examples of IBM mainframes, Cray supercomputers, Commodore home computers, personal computers from Apple and IBM. It claims to feature "one of the few complete Apple-collections worldwide".

Part of the museum is a collection of 300 mechanical calculators of the Swiss collector Peter Regenass. Furthermore, it holds a large collection on the history of radio and television including a vast number of radio and TV sets, recording devices for audio and video and projectors including the Eidophor projectors used 1958 - 1999.Over time the Enter Museum has integrated other collections such as the Audiorama Montreux, which closed its doors in 2010 or the computer collection of the Swiss collector Robert Weiss or Peter Beck. Its collection has been named as outstanding by the media, the Neue Zürcher Zeitung writes "It's hard to name a Computer that had any technical or commercial significance in the last 50 Years, which could not be viewed here".

=== Selected exhibits ===
- Switzerland's first radio station that started regular emission in Lausanne as early as 26 February 1923.
- Early home computers such as Mark-8 minicomputer, Commodore PET 2001 or Apple 1
- Mechanical calculators such as The Millionaire calculator and Curta.
- Cryptographic devices of Crypto AG, Gretag and others including the Swiss Nema and the Russian Fialka
- The Smaky-computer of Swiss engineer Jean-Daniel Nicoud and the Lilith Computer by Niklaus Wirth
- The video projector Eidophor used 1958 – 1999.
- The outdoor projector Spitlight used at the 1956 Olympic winter games in Cortina di Ampezzo.

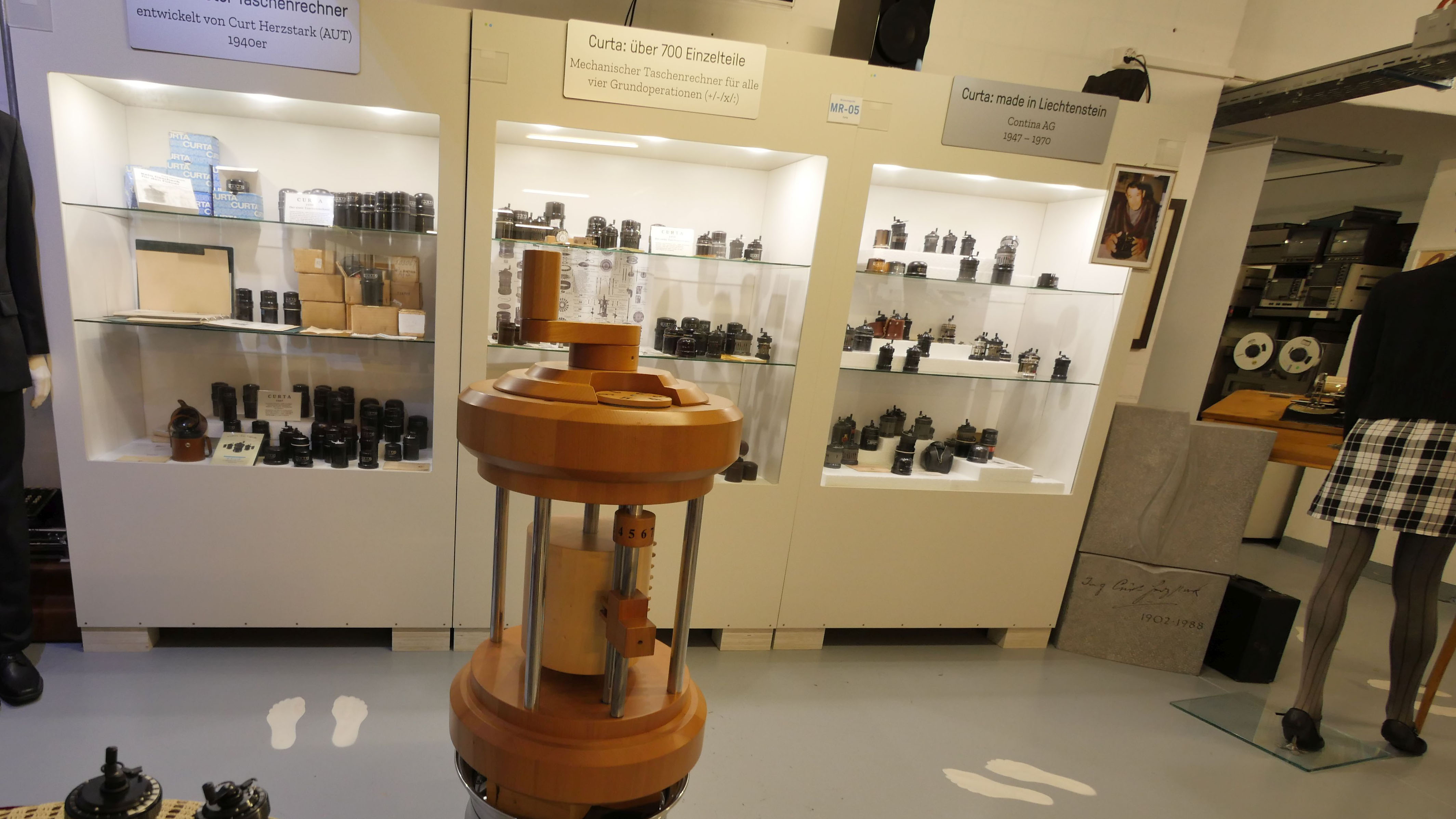
A wooden model of the Curta calculator machine

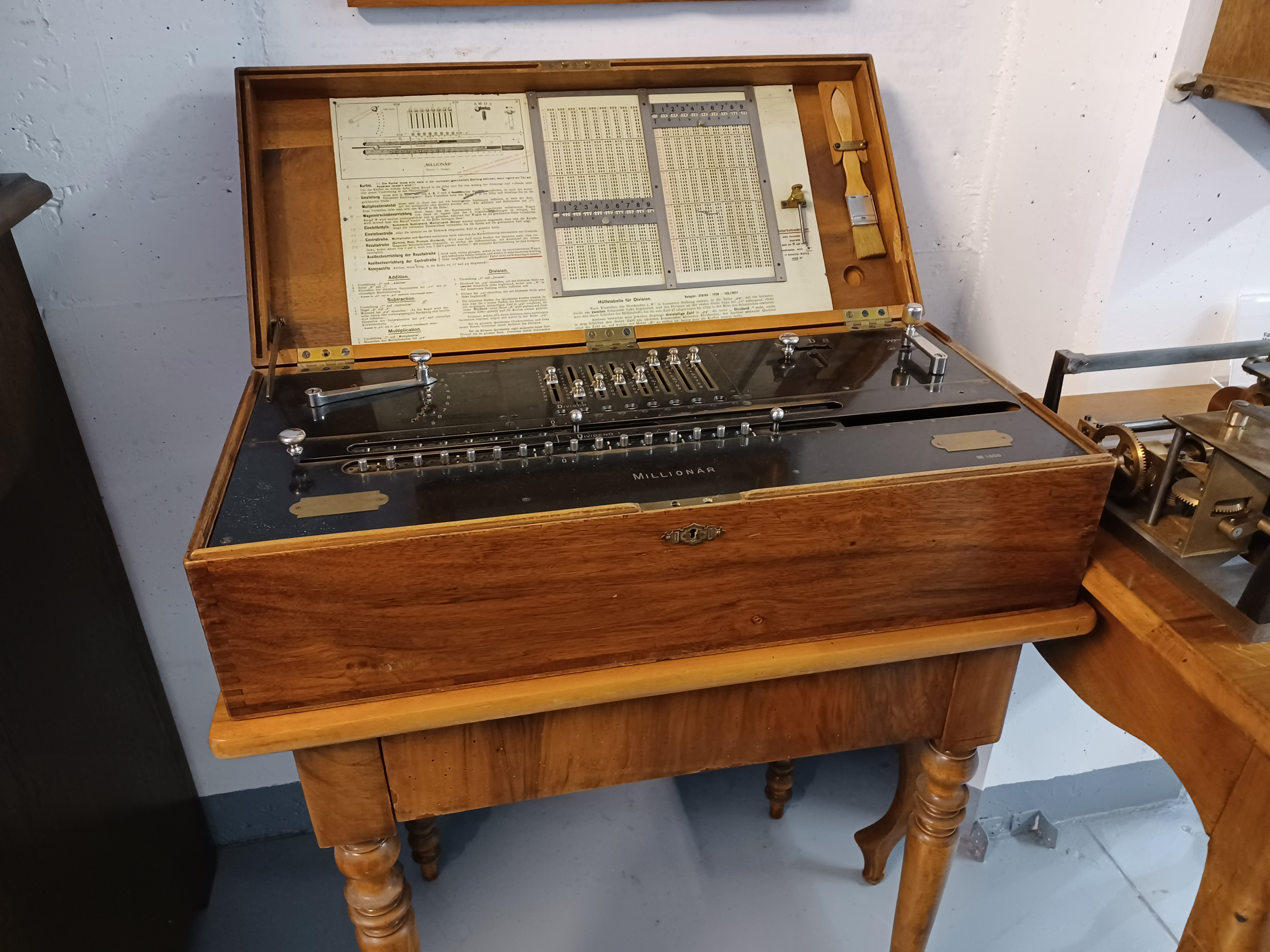
The mechanical calculator Millionaire

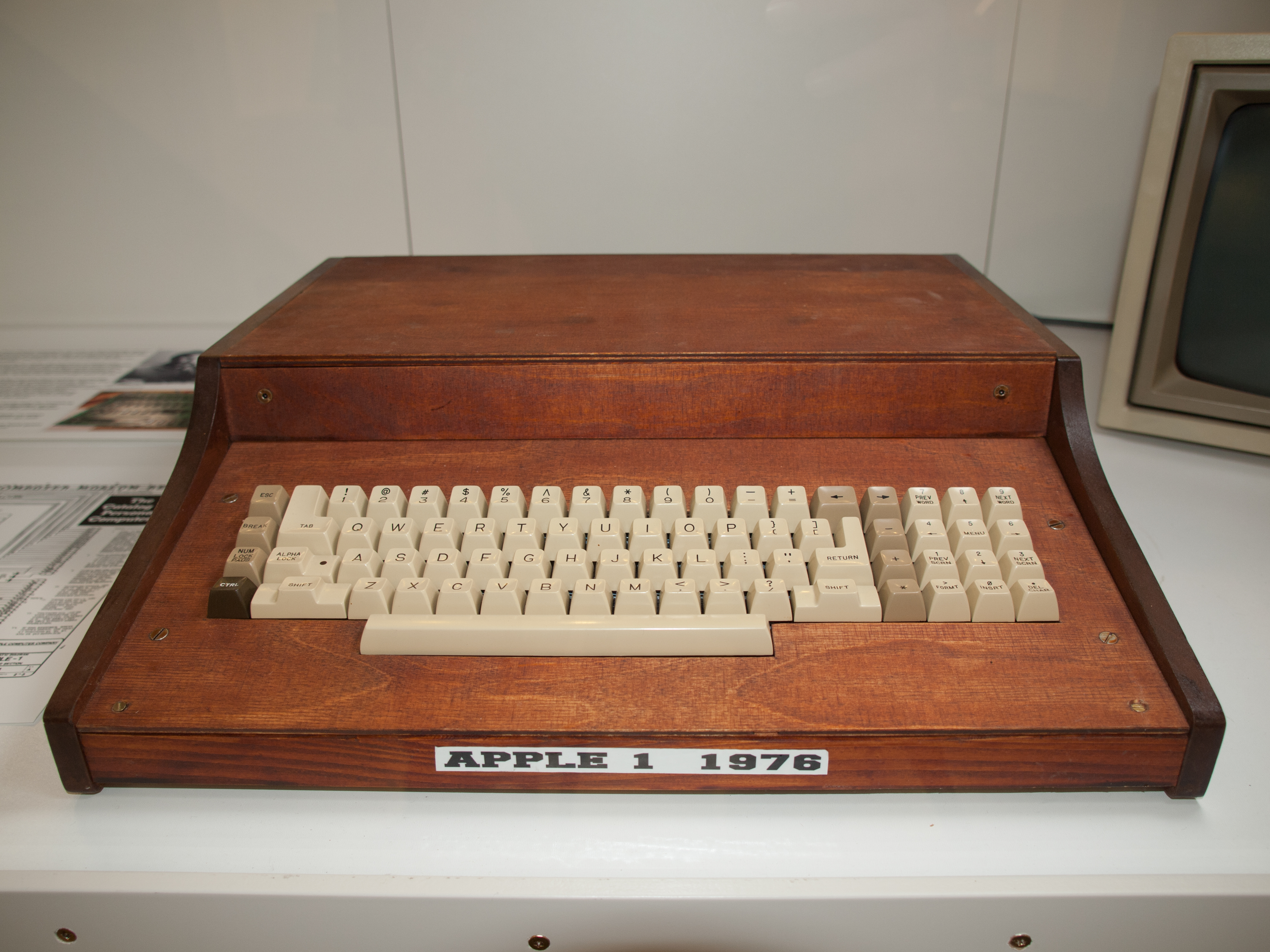
The Apple 1 computer of 1976 with a custom case - one of the highlights of the museum

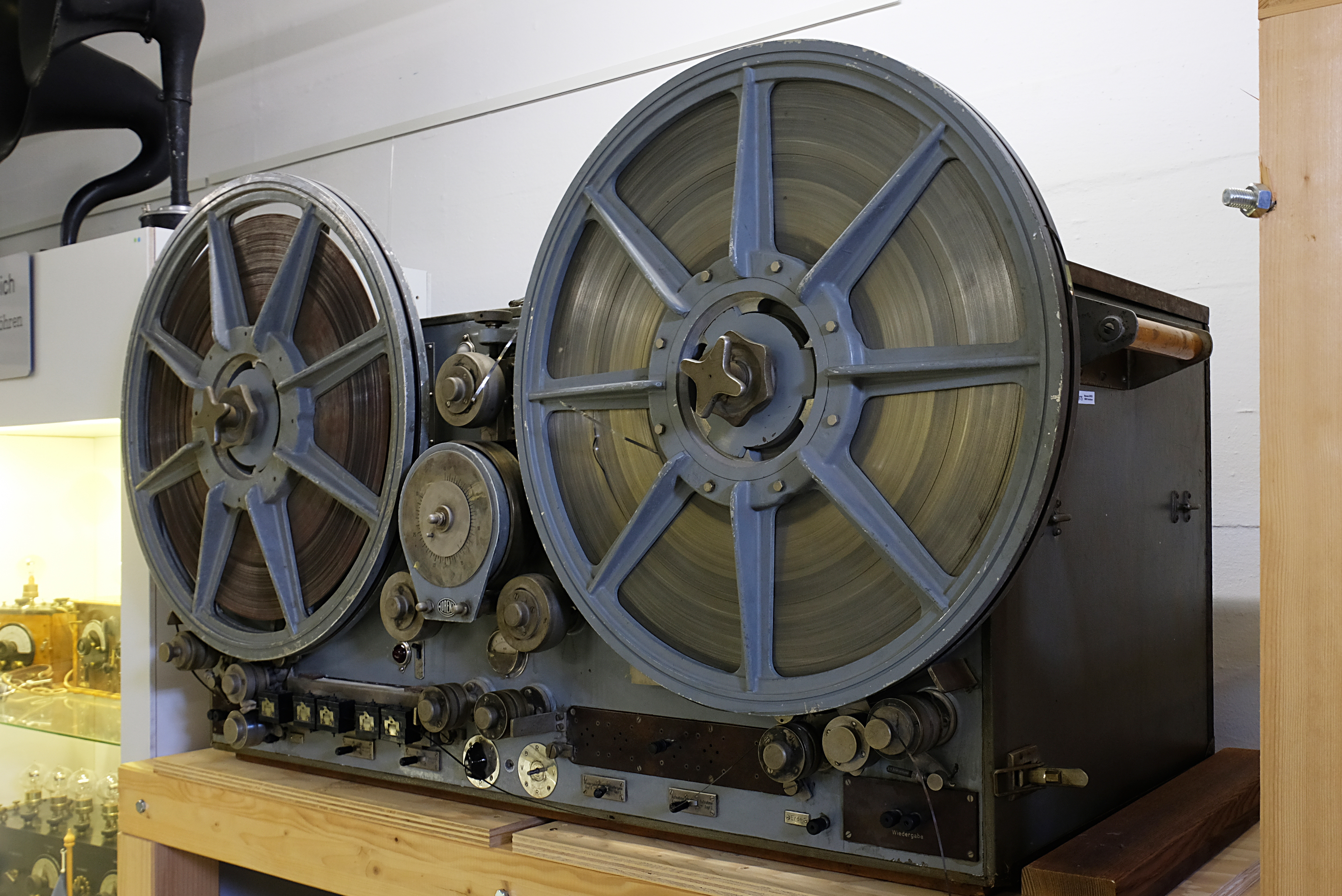
An early sound recording device produced by the German company Lorenz. It used a steel band to record.

== Museum shop for spare parts ==
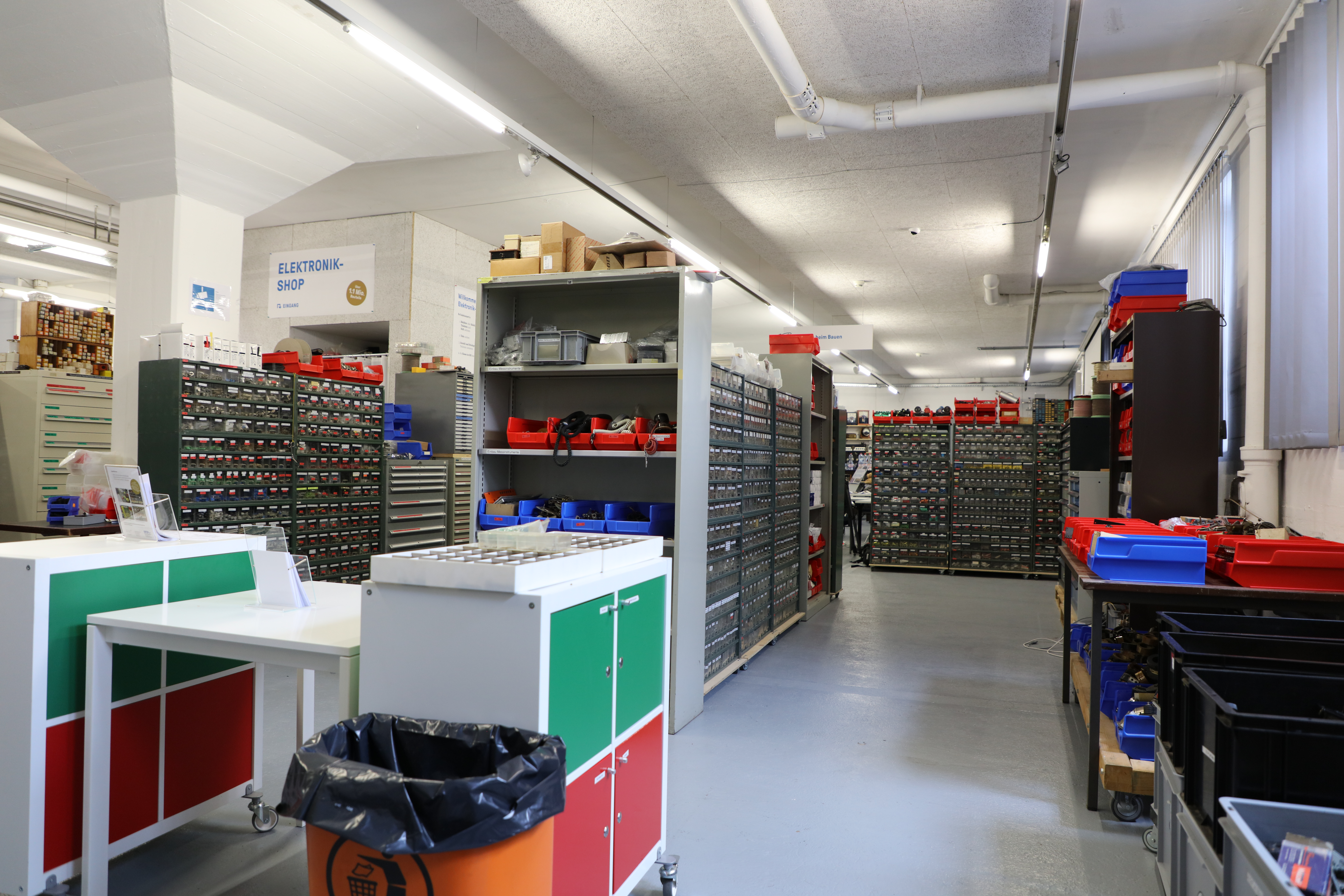
The shop of the Enter museums has more than 1 million spare parts including 40 000 vintage valves.

The museum endeavors to keep as many of its artifacts working and has a number of veteran engineers and specialists that support the museum as volunteers. The museum keeps a stock of 1.5 million electronic and mechanical spare parts including 40'000 radio valves that can also be purchased at their nominal price from the museum shop.

== See also ==
- List of museums in Switzerland
- List of computer museums
