= Anton Gunzinger =

Electronics engineer, entrepreneur

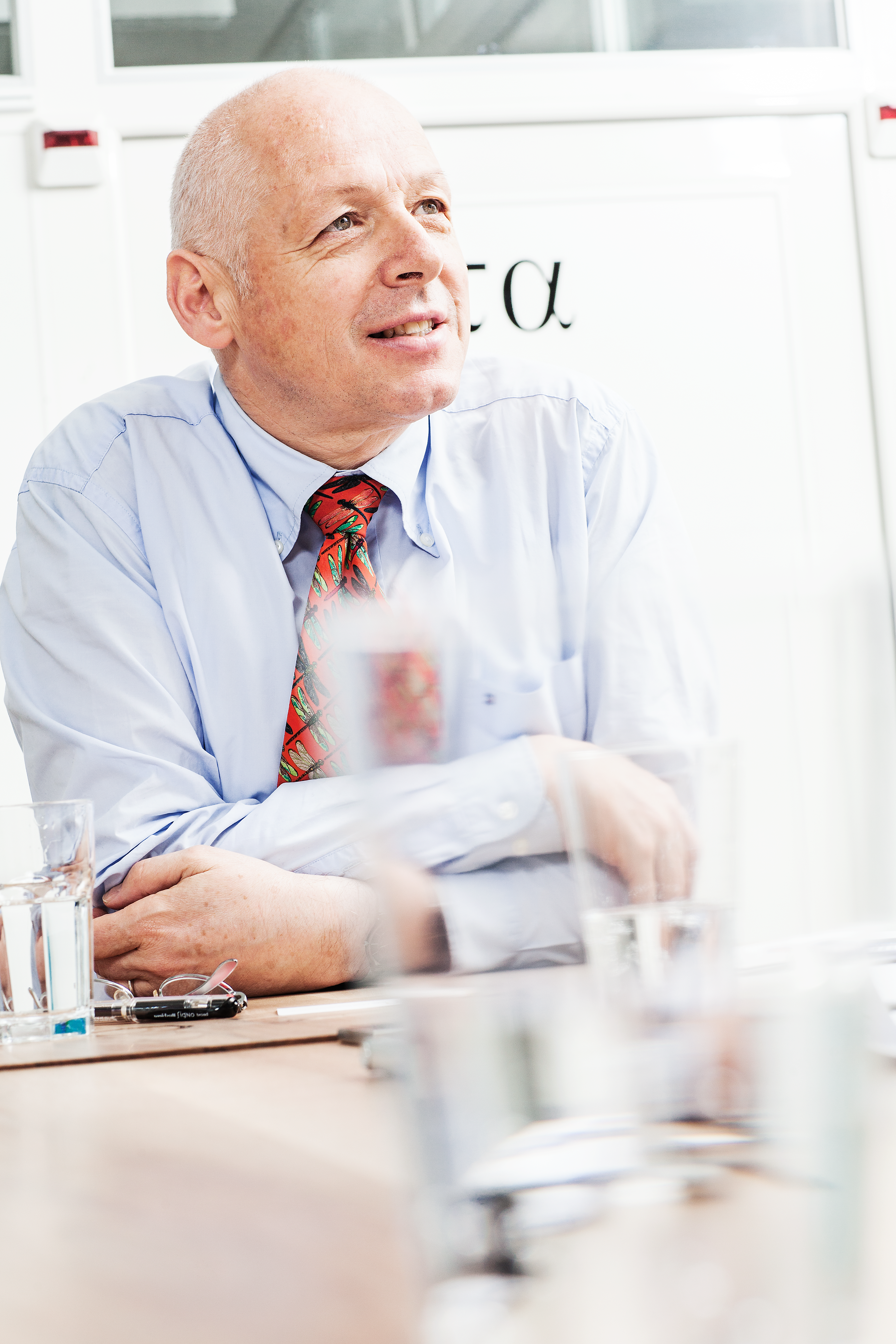
Anton Gunzinger

Anton Gunzinger (born 8 May 1956, Welschenrohr, Switzerland) is a Swiss electrical engineer and entrepreneur. He was a developer of high-performance parallelized computers.

== Life ==
Anton Gunzinger first did an apprenticeship as a radio electrician, followed by vocational secondary school and the technical college in Biel. He then studied electrical engineering at the Swiss Federal Institute of Technology (ETH) in Zurich and graduated as an electrical engineer in 1983. This was followed by an assistant position at the Institute of Electronics with Walter Guggenbühl and the preparation of a doctoral thesis entitled Synchronous Data Flow Computer for Real-Time Image Processing. He received his Ph.D. with it in 1989.

Gunzinger presented a parallel computer consisting of 18 processors connected in parallel in 1990: the Synchronous Data Flow Machine, or Sydama, as part of a system for real-time image processing. For his work on Sydama, Gunzinger won the 100,000 Swiss franc prize of the de Vigier Foundation for the Promotion of Young Swiss Entrepreneurs.

As a senior assistant at ETH Zurich, he and his team developed the MUltiprocessor System with Intelligent Communication (MUSIC system). This computer system with several interconnected processors and a performance of 3.6 gigaflops (billion floating point operations per second) was one of the most powerful computers in the world at the time. With MUSIC, he participated as a finalist for the Gordon Bell Award of the AMC and IEEE at the 1992 Supercomputing conference in Minneapolis in competition with the most well-known manufacturers of supercomputers, came in second behind Intel, and was honored for his efforts. As a result, Time magazine selected Gunzinger as one of the 100 upcoming leaders worldwide in 1994.

In 1993, together with a business economist, he founded the company Supercomputing Systems AG in the Technopark Zurich with the aim of developing low-cost supercomputers. More than 20 years later, his company is still successful, with customized products being developed in a wide range of competence areas since about 1997. Gunzinger was awarded a doctorate by the ETH Zurich.

ETH Zurich awarded Gunzinger the title of professor in 2002, where he lectured on computer architectures in the Department of Information Technology and Electrical Engineering.

Gunzinger is committed to an orientation of energy technology without nuclear power plants and reduction of the use of fossil fuels. He regrets the relatively slow progress in the transformation of energy production in accordance with the Energy Strategy 2050.

He took a position on the management of the COVID-19 pandemic in Switzerland: in his view, consistent, comprehensive protection of at-risk groups (six percent of the total population), especially the over-80s, would be sufficient to lift restrictions for everyone else. Gunzinger advocated a sweep of the under-80s, which could end the pandemic within one to two months-without overloading hospitals. In his view, the COVID-19 pandemic was as bad as the 2015 flu epidemic.

== Awards ==
- 1986: ETH Zurich Innovation Prize
- 1989: Seymour Cray Prize Switzerland
- 1990: Prize of the de Vigier Foundation for the promotion of young Swiss entrepreneurs
- 1993: Promotion Prize of the Technopark Zurich Foundation
- 2001: Entrepreneur of the year 2001

== Other activities ==
- Chairman of the Board of Directors of Supercomputing Systems AG (SCS), Zurich
- Board member of the asset management company Forma Futura Invest AG, Zurich

== Publications ==
- Who computes faster? In: Franz Betschon et al. (eds.): Ingenieure bauen die Schweiz - Technikgeschichte aus erster Hand. Verlag Neue Zürcher Zeitung, Zurich 2013, pp. 458-469, ISBN 978-3-03823-791-4.
- Power Plant Switzerland. Plea for an energy turnaround with a future. Verlag Zytglogge 2015, ISBN 978-3-7296-0888-7.
