= NEMA (machine) =

Rotor cipher machine

- Date invented: during the World War II
- Manufacturer: Zellweger AG, Switzerland
- Type: rotor machine

In the history of cryptography, the NEMA (NEue MAschine) ("new machine"), also designated the T-D (Tasten-Druecker-Maschine) ("key-stroke machine"), was a 10-wheel rotor machine designed by the Swiss Army during World War II as a replacement for their Enigma machines.

== History ==
The Swiss became aware that their current machine, a commercial Enigma (the Swiss K), had been broken by both Allied and German cryptanalysts.

A new design was begun between 1941 and 1943 by Captain Arthur Alder, a professor of mathematics at the University of Bern. The team which designed the machine also included Professors Hugo Hadwiger and Heinrich Emil Weber.

In the spring of 1944, the first prototype had become available. After some modifications, the design was accepted in March 1945, and production of 640 machines began the following month by Zellweger AG. The first machine entered service in 1947.

NEMA was declassified on 9 July 1992, and machines were offered for sale to the public on 4 May 1994.

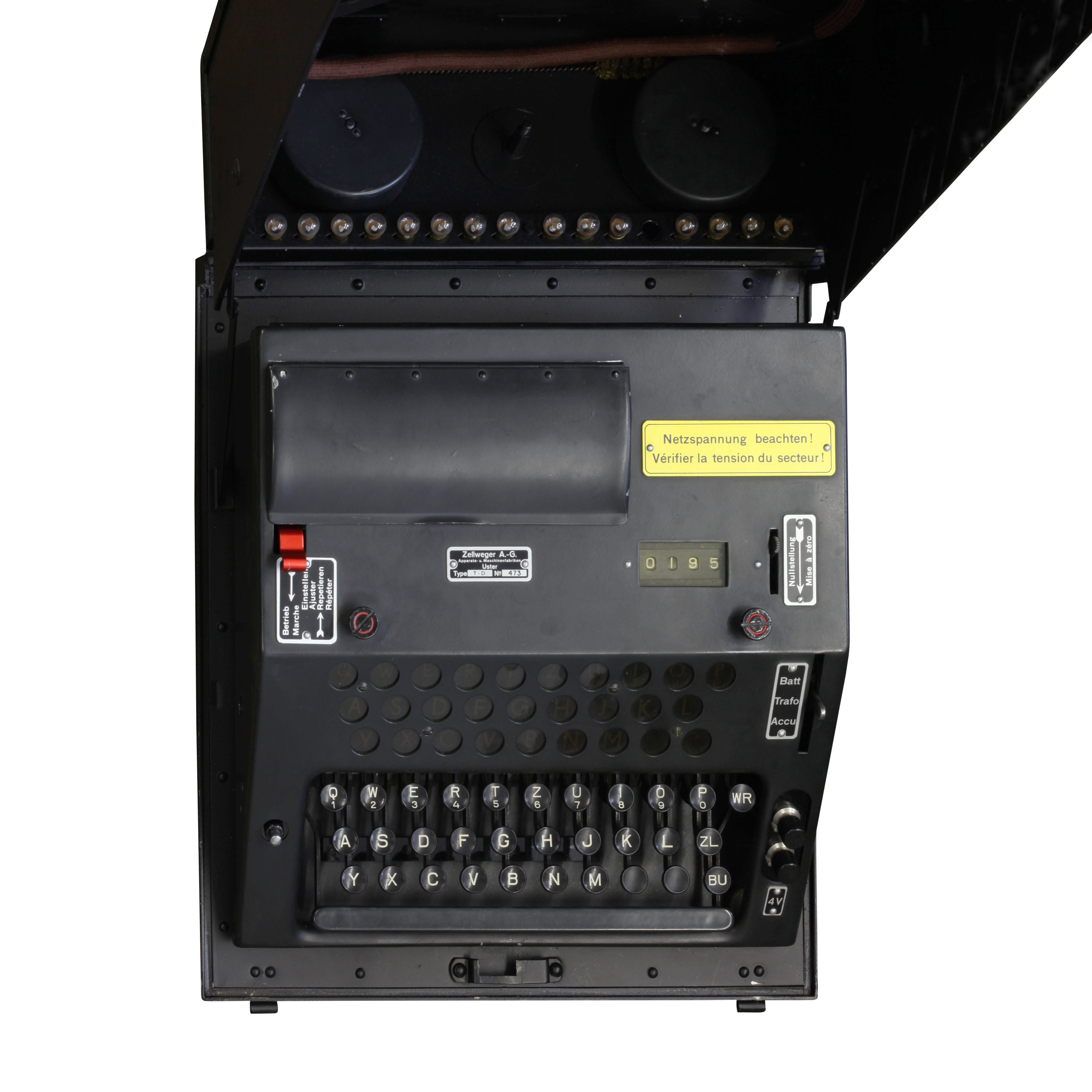
The NEMA machine was a Swiss rotor machine, designed to replace commercial Enigma machines.

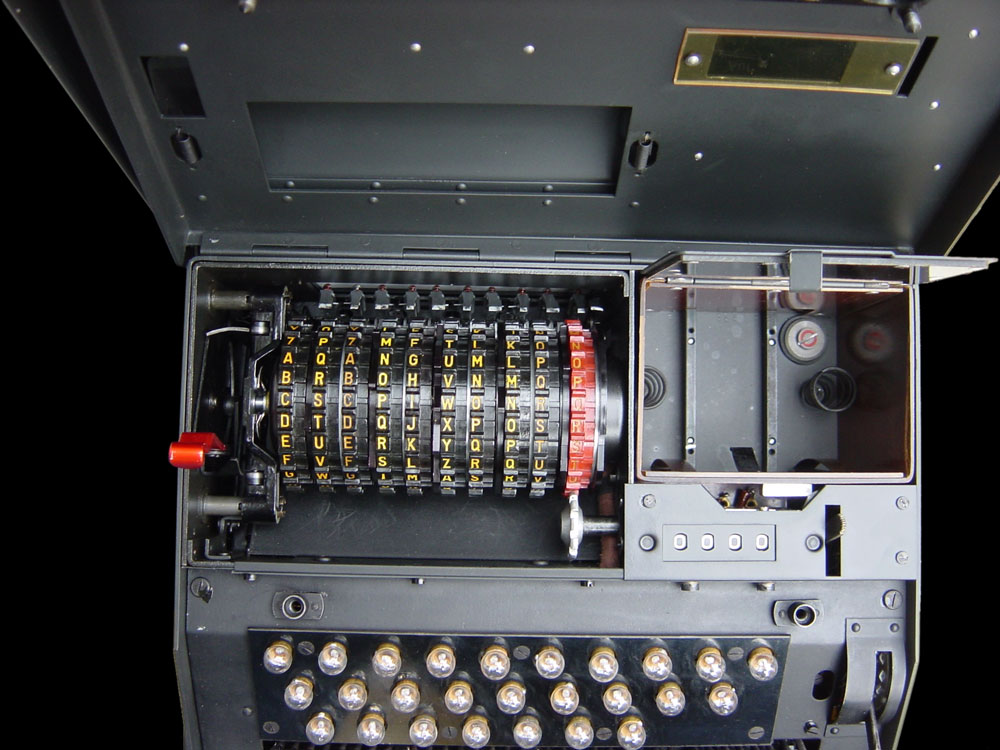
NEMA uses 10 wheels, of which one is a reflector, four are normal rotors, and the remaining five are "Drive wheels", which control the stepping of the rotors and the reflector.

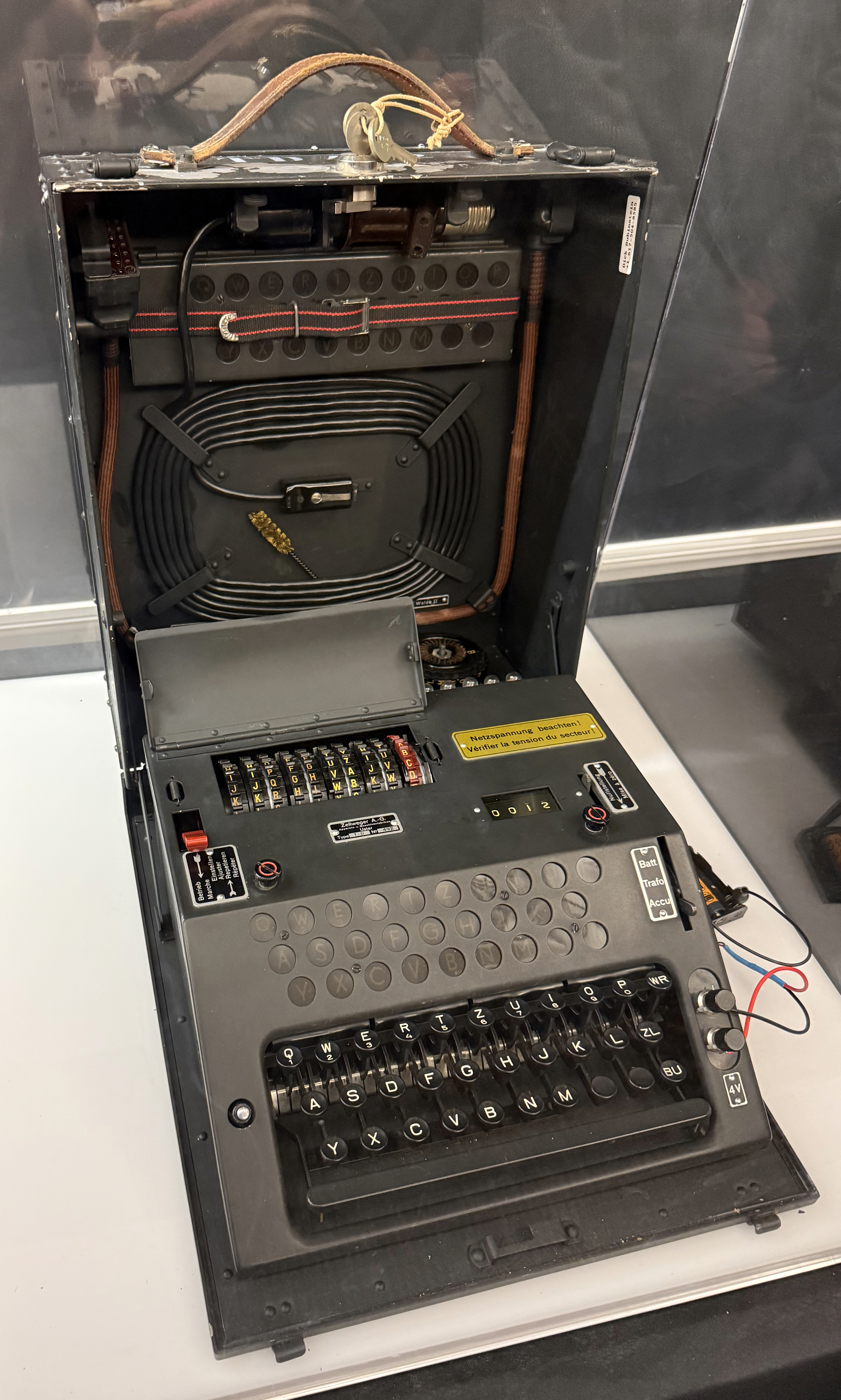
Another view of a NEMA

== The machine ==
NEMA uses 10 wheels, of which four are normal electrical rotors with 26 contacts at each end that are scramble wired in a way unique to each rotor type; one is an electrical reflector (like the Enigma's Umkehrwalze) with one set of 26 pairwise cross connected contacts; and the remaining five are "drive wheels", with mechanical cams that control the stepping of the rotors and the reflector. The wheels are assembled on an axle in pairs consisting of a drive wheel and an electrical rotor.

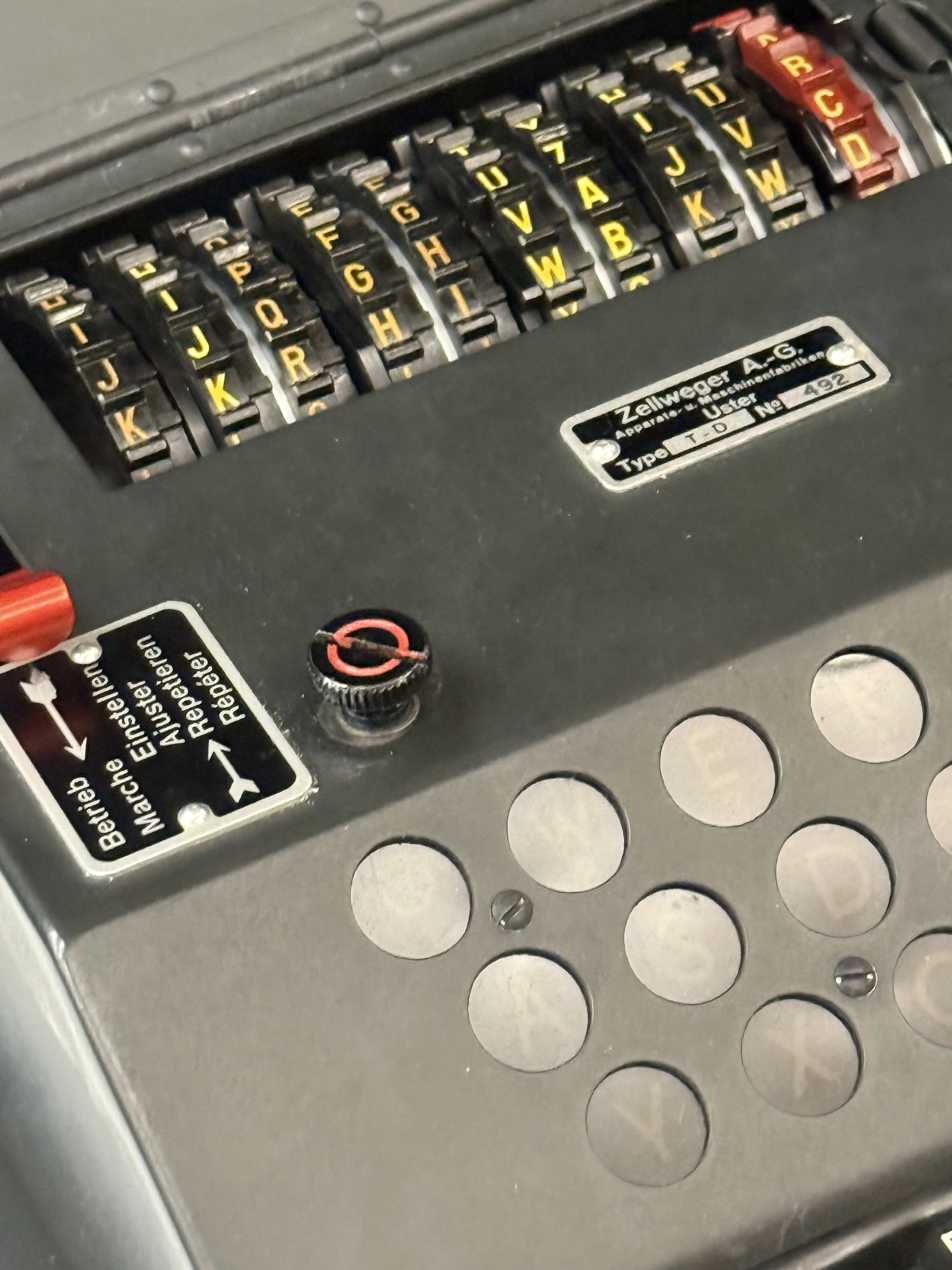
Close up of rotors

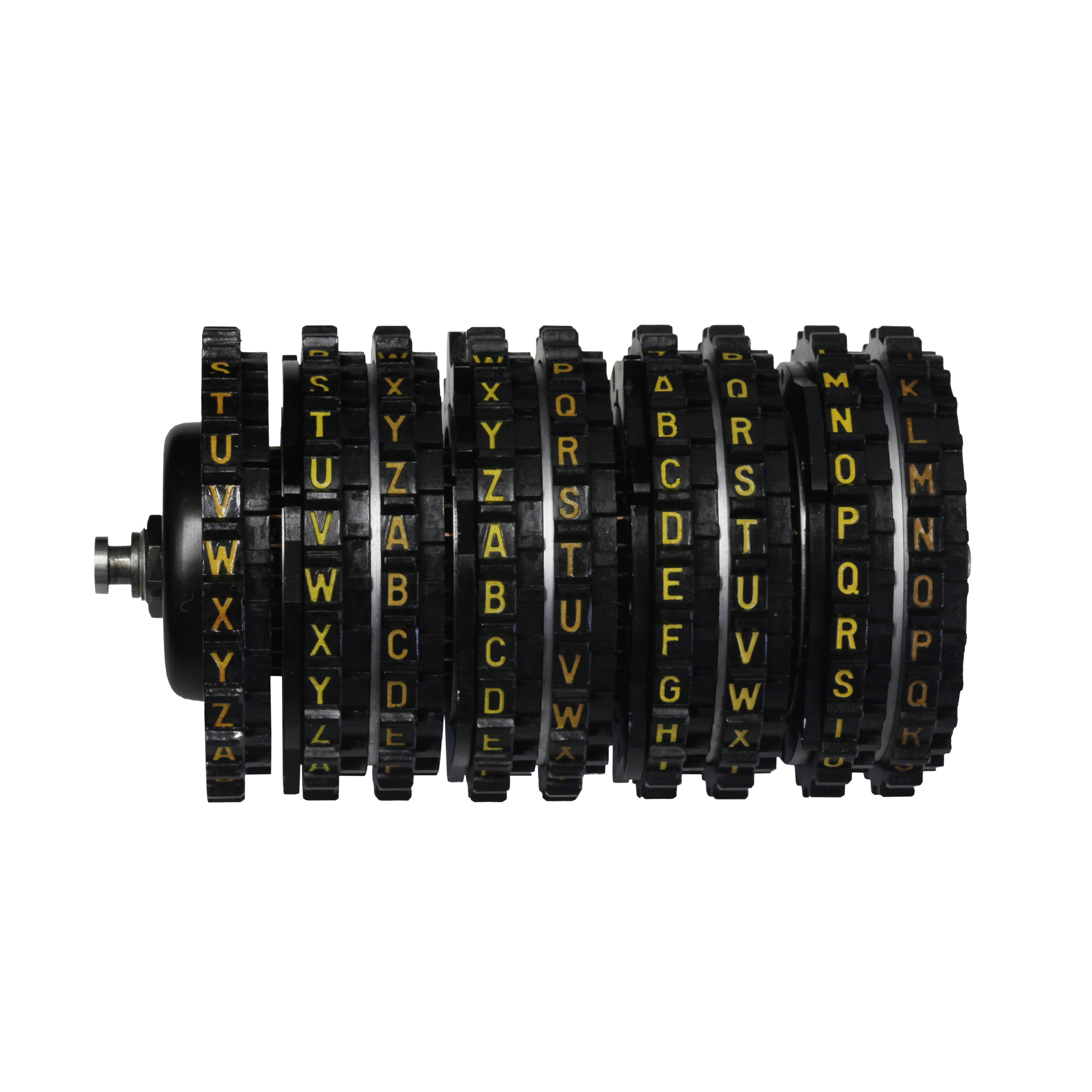
The four rotor pairs and the reflector

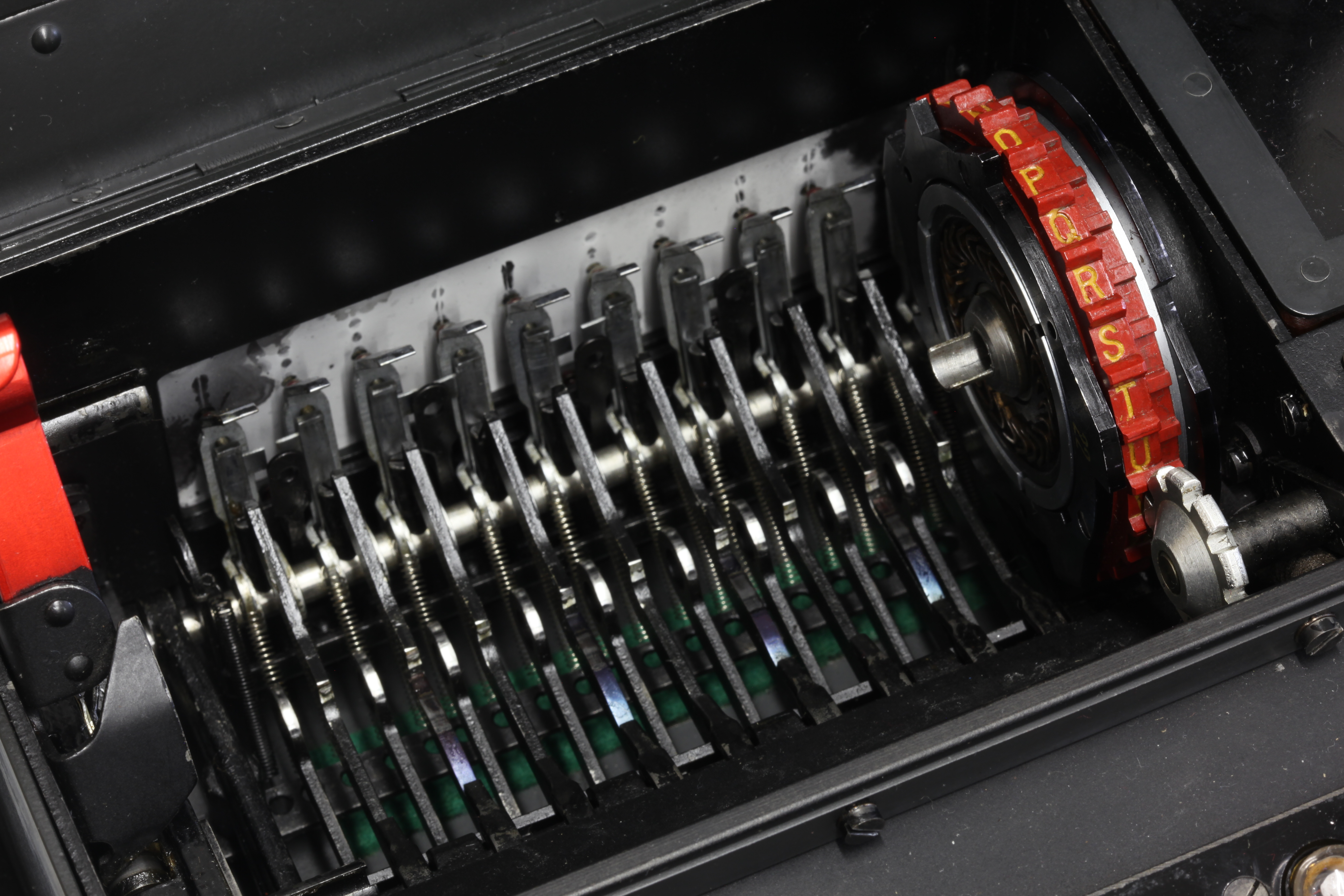
The rotor lodging with the cams and first rotor

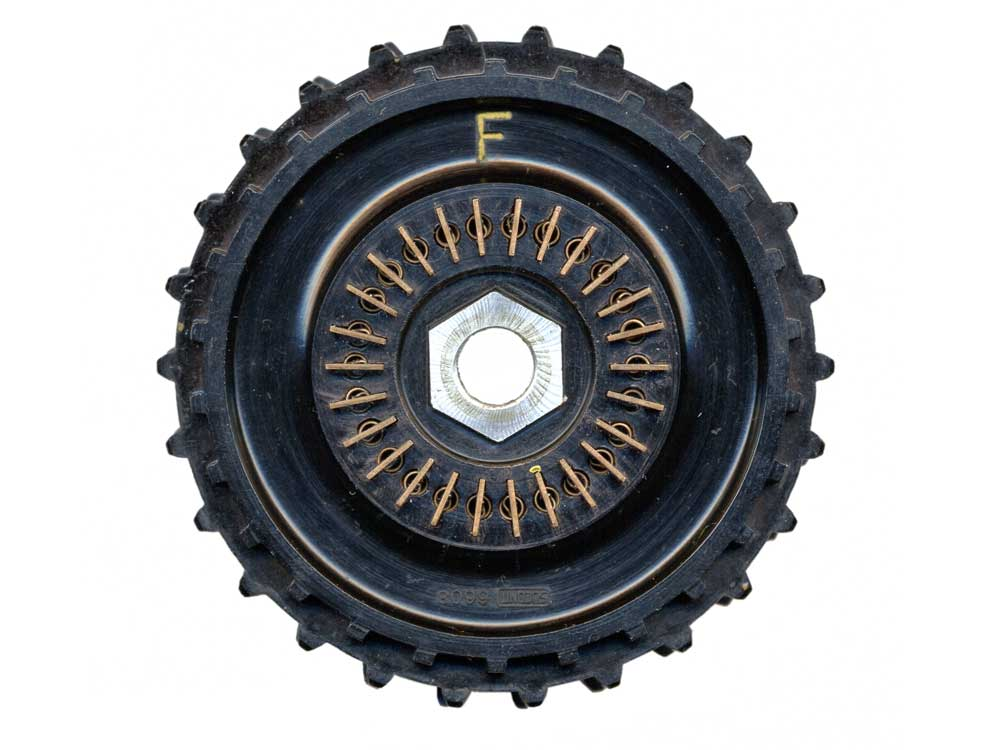
Top view of a NEMA rotor pair. Electrical rotor "F."

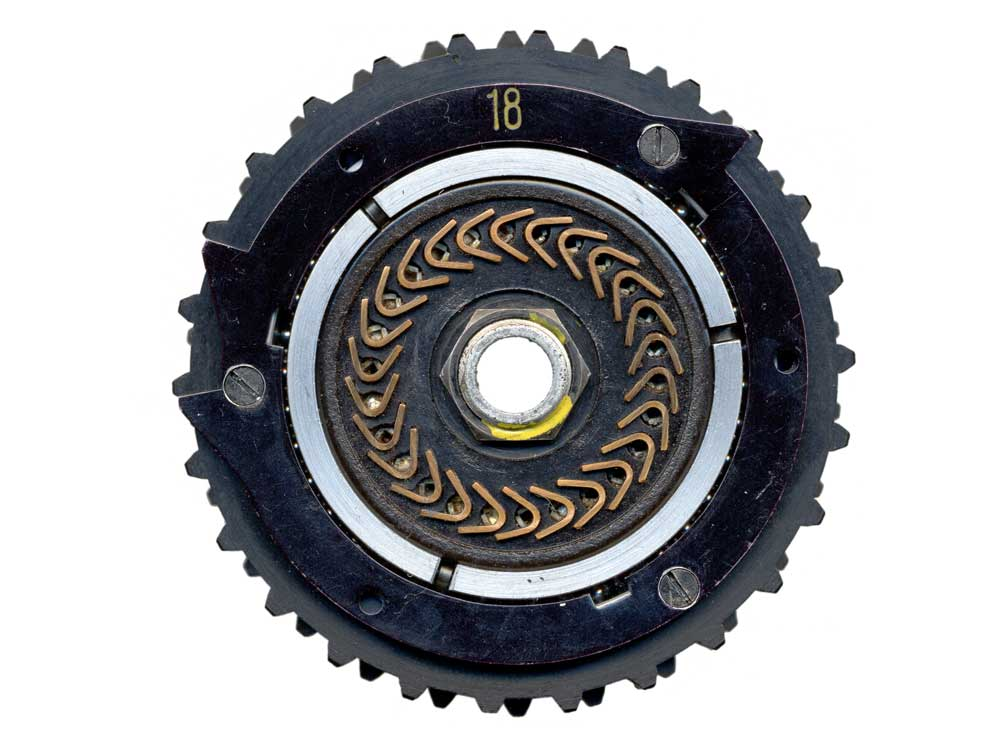
Bottom view of a NEMA rotor pair. Drive rotor "18." Note the three stepping-control cams.

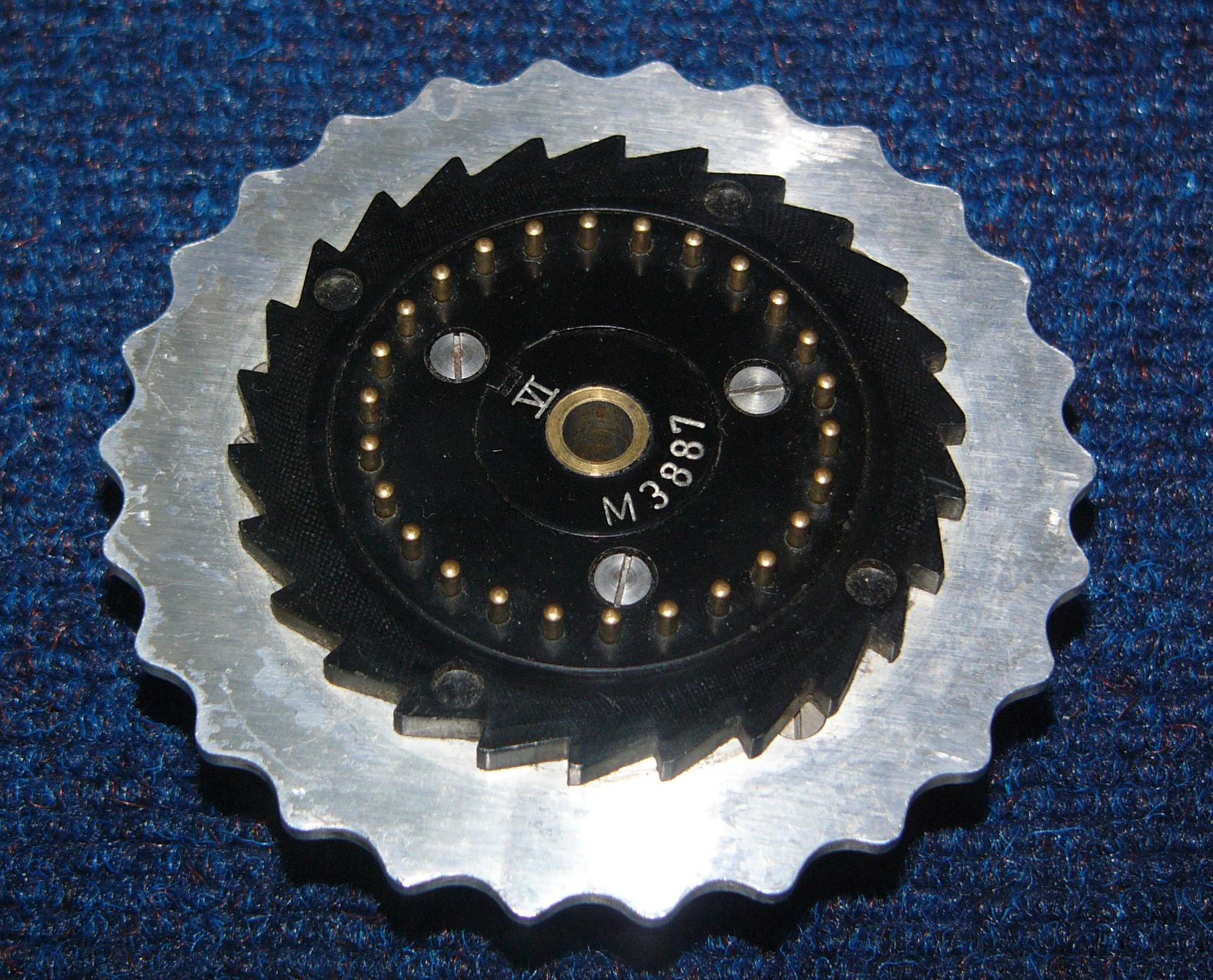
An Enigma rotor.

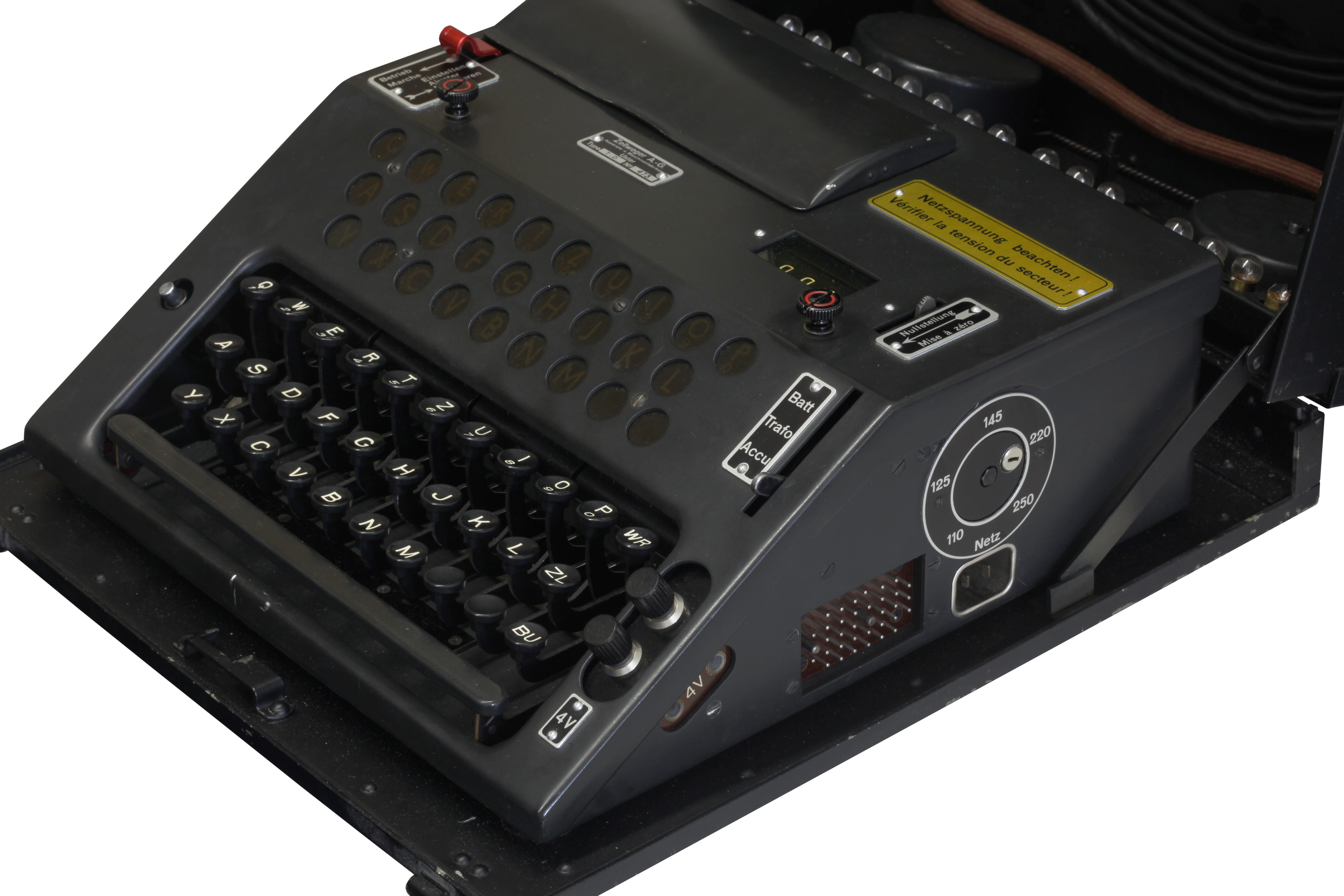
view of the right side of the machine with the port for the removable extra lamp panel

The NEMA machine weighs about 10 kg and measures approximately 36×32×14 cm.

== See also ==
- Fialka
- Typex
- SIGABA
