= Kavi =

Kavi or KAVI may refer to:

== People ==
- Agasthya Kavi, 14th century composer from Warangal
- Appachcha Kavi (1868–1930), Indian poet and playwright
- Archana Kavi (born 1988), Indian film actress and YouTuber
- Arunachala Kavi (1711–1779), Tamil poet and a composer
- Ashok Row Kavi (born 1947), Indian journalist and LGBT rights activist
- Emmanuel Kavi (born 1970), African contemporary artist and painter
- Giriraja Kavi, 18th century Telugu composer
- Gnanananda Kavi (1922–2011), Indian poet
- Lakshmidhara Kavi, Advaita Vedanta preceptor and writer of Advaita Makaranda
- Kasula Purushottama Kavi (fl. 1798), Indian poet
- Nadella Purushottama Kavi (1863–1939), scholar, playwright, teacher and editor
- Nanalal Dalpatram Kavi (1877–1946), Gujarati author and poet
- Oothukkadu Venkata Kavi (1700s–1765), Indian composer
- Udumalai Narayana Kavi (1899–1981), Tamil poet
- Kavi Bhushan (c. 1613–1712), Indian court poet
- Kavi Kalash (died 1689), Indian Brahmin and poet
- Kavi Kant (1867–1923), Gujarati poet, playwright and essayist
- Kavi Kumar Azad (1972–2018), Indian actor
- Kavi Kunjara Bharati (1810–1896), Tamil poet and a composer
- Kavi Pradeep (1915–1998), Indian poet and songwriter
- Kavi Raz (born 1953), Indian-born British actor, writer, director and producer
- Kavi Shastri (born 1986), British film and television actor

== Other uses ==
- Kavi, Gujarat, a place in India
- Kavi (1949 film), Bengali film directed by Debaki Kumar Bose
- Kavi (2009 film), a 2009 American Hindi-language short film
- Kavi (1954 film), a Hindi film of 1954
- KAVI-LP, a radio station in Colorado
- KAVI (National Audiovisual Institute), a Finnish cultural organisation

== See also ==
- Kawi (disambiguation)
- Kavya (disambiguation)
- Kaviraj, a title of honor given to poets and litterateurs attached to royal courts in medieval India
- Kalleh Kavi, a village in Iran
- Rishi, an inspired poet of hymns from the Vedas
- Kayanian dynasty, a dynasty of Persian tradition and folklore which supposedly ruled after the Pishdadids
