= Chadha =

Khatri surname in India

Chadha, variously spelt as Chadda, Chahda, Chaddha, is an Indian surname used by the Punjabi Khatri caste. Notable people who bear the name, but are not necessarily associated with the caste, include:

== Activists ==
- Ena Chadha, Indo-Canadian human rights lawyer, investigator, author and educator
- Satya Rani Chadha (1933–2014), Indian women's rights activist

== Actors ==
- Manmohan Krishna Chadha (1921–1990), Indian actor
- Mukul Chadda, Indian actor
- Richa Chadda (born 1986), Indian actress
- Rishab Chadha (born 1994), Indian actor
- Sahila Chadha, Indian actress
- Sheeba Chaddha (born 1973), Indian actress
- Shyam Chadda (1920–1951), Indian veteran actor
- Manu Rishi Chadha (born 1971), Indian actor

== Armed forces ==
- Mahip Chadha (died 2017), colonel in the Indian army and writer on military history
- Manish Chadha, Indian admiral
- Mukesh Chadha, Indian general
- Puneet Chadha, Rear admiral in the Indian Navy

== Artists ==
- Amar Chadha-Patel (born 1986), British actor, filmmaker and musician
- Ankit Chadha (1987–2018), Indian writer, story-teller, oral narrative performance artist
- Gurinder Chadha (born 1960), Oscar winning British film director
- Hersh Chadha (born 1957), Indian photographer
- Sarbjit Singh Chadha (born 1952), Indian singer, said to be the first non-Japanese enka singer.

== Athletes ==
- Ishpreet Singh Chadha (born 1996), Indian snooker player
- Matt Chahda (born 1993), Indian-Australian race driver
- Ramesh Chadha, Indian cricketer
- Ravinder Chadha (born 1951), Indian cricketer

== Academics and scientists ==
- Anju Chadha (born 1955), Indian biochemist
- G. K. Chadha (1940–2014), Indian economist
- Jagjit Chadha (born 1966), British economist
- Krishna Lal Chadha (1936–2025), Indian horticultural scientist
- Monima Chadha, Indian philosopher and professor
- Neeru Chadha (born 1955), Indian jurist and bureaucrat

== Entrepreneurs ==
- Baljit Singh Chadha (born 1951), Canadian businessman
- Ponty Chadha (1960–2012), Indian businessman
- Rattan Chadha (born 1949), Dutch businessman
- Rohit Chadda (born 1982), Indian investment banker and entrepreneur

== Politicians ==
- Dinesh Chadha, Indian politician
- Gurmukh Singh Musafir (1899–1976), Indian politician
- Raghav Chadha (born 1988), Indian politician
- Renu Chadha, Indian politician

== Bureaucrats ==
- Indrajit Singh Chadha (born 1933), Indian diplomat

== See also ==
- Immigration and Naturalization Service v. Chadha, a 1983 decision of the U.S. Supreme Court
- Laal Singh Chaddha, 2022 Hindi film
- Mukhtiar Chadha, 2015 Punjabi film
