= Kavitha =

Kavitha or Kavitha (lit. 'poetry') may refer to:

- Kāvya, Sanskrit genre of literary poetry
- Kavita, an Indian female given name
  - Kavitha (actress) (born 1965), Indian actress and politician
  - Kavitha Anandasivam (born 2002), Sri Lankan-Australian actress
  - Kavitha Balakrishnan, Indian art critic, curator and artist
  - Kavitha Bhatia, Indian-American physician
  - Kavitha Gowda, Indian actress
  - Kavita Krishnamurti, Indian playback singer
  - Kavitha Lankesh, Indian filmmaker and director in Kannada cinema
  - Kavitha Maloth, Indian politician
  - Kavitha Nair, Indian television presenter
  - Kavitha Ranjini or Urvashi (actress), Indian actress
  - Kavitha Rao, Indian journalist, author and lawyer
  - Kavitha Selvaraj, Indian kabaddi player
  - Kavitha Telikepalli, Indian computer scientist
- Kavitha (1962 film), an Indian Tamil-language film
- Kavitha (1973 film), an Indian Malayalam-language film
- Kavita (TV series), an Indian soap opera
- Kavita (poetry magazine), an Indian Bengali-language poetry magazine
- Kavitha, Anand district, a village in Borsad, Anand district, Gujarat, India

== See also ==
- Kavya (disambiguation)
- Kobita Club, Indian literary club
- Kobita Jugnauth, wife of Indo-Mauritian politician Pravind Jugnauth, held the title of spouse of the Prime Minister from 2017 to 2024
