= Nadella =

Nadella or Nadellaa may refer to:

== People ==
- Nadella (surname), various people with the last name
- Nadella Purushottama Kavi (1863–1938), Indian scholar, playwright, teacher and editor
- Satya Nadella (1967-present), CEO of Microsoft Corporation from 2014-present

== See also ==
- Nadela, a system of canals and rivers in northern Serbia
- Nadellaa, an inhabited islands of Gaafu Dhaalu Atoll, Maldives
