= Anju =

Anju may refer to:

== Arts and entertainment ==
- Anju, a character in The Legend of Zelda series
- Anju Maaka, a character in the Chibi Vampire series
- Anchu Sundarikal (or Anju Sundarikal), a 1968 Indian Malayalam language film

== People ==
- Anju (given name), including a list of people with the name
- Anju (actress), Indian actress in Malayalam and Tamil films

== Places ==
- Anju, Iran, a village in Chaharmahal and Bakhtiari Province, Iran
- Anju, South Pyongan, a city of South Pyongan province, North Korea
  - Anju Castle
  - Anju T'an'gwang Line, a railway line; more commonly known as Sŏhae Line
- Anju District, district of Suining, Sichuan, China
- Anju railway station, Inner Mongolia, China
- Anju, Sui County (安居镇), a town in Sui County, Suizhou, Hubei, China

== Other uses ==
- Anju (food), a general term for Korean side dishes consumed while drinking
- Housing (TV series) or Anju, a 2016 Chinese TV series

== See also ==
- Anjou (disambiguation)
