= Anju (given name) =

Anju is the Romanized form of several given names of unrelated origin. In Indic languages, Anju is a diminutive form of the female given names Anjali and Anjana. In Japanese, Anju (Japanese: 杏樹) is a female given name meaning 'apricot tree'.

- Anju (actress), Indian actress in Malayalam and Tamil films
- Anju Aravind, Indian actress in Malayalam, Tamil, and Telugu films
- Anju Bala (born 1979), Indian politician
- Anju Bhargava, American management consultant and advisor to Barack Obama
- Anju Bobby George (born 1977), Indian long-jumper
- Anju Chadha, Indian biochemist
- Anju Chaudhuri (born 1944), Bengali-French artist
- Anju Dhillon, Canadian politician
- Anju Dodiya, (born 1964) Indian contemporary painter
- Anju Ghosh, Bangladeshi film actress
- Anju Gurung, (1994) Bhutanese cricketer
- Anju Inami (born 1996), Japanese voice actress
- Anju Jain (born 1974), Indian cricketer
- Anju Jason (born 1987) Marshallese sportsperson
- Anju Joseph (born 1990), Malayali singer
- Anju Kumari, Nepalese politician
- Anju Kurian, Indian film actress
- Anju Mahendru (born 1946), Indian actress in Hindi shows
- Anju Makhija, Indian poet, playwright, and translator
- Anju Modi, Indian costume designer
- Anju Nakamura (born 2000), Japanese Nordic combined skier
- Anju Panta (born 1977), Nepali singer
- Anju Suzuki (born 1969), Japanese actress, known professionally as Kakko or Kakuko Yamagata
- Anju Takamizawa (born 1996), Japanese athlete
- Anju Tamang (born 1995), Indian women's international footballer
