= Kavya (disambiguation) =

Kavya may refer to:

- Kāvya, a Sanskrit literary style
- Kavya (film), a 1995 Indian film
- Kavya – Ek Jazbaa, Ek Junoon, Indian drama television series
- Kavya Bharati, an annual literary journal
- Kavya Luthra, a fictional character portrayed by Kiara Advani in the YRF Spy Universe

People

- Kaavya Arivumani, Indian television actress
- Kavya Ajit, singer from Kerala, India
- Kavya Kalyanram, Indian film actress
- Kavya Keeran, Indian actress and model
- Kavya Madhavan, Indian film actress
- Kavya Manyapu, Indian–American engineer
- Kavya Maran, Indian businesswoman
- Kaavya Sha, Indian actress
- Kavya Shetty, Indian film actress and model
- Kavya Shivashankar, Indian-American champion of the Scripps National Spelling Bee
- Kavya Thapar, Indian actress
- Kaavya Viswanathan, Indian author involved in a plagiarism scandal

== See also ==
- Kavi (disambiguation)
- Kavitha (disambiguation)
- Kaaviya Thalaivan (disambiguation)
- Kavyanjali (disambiguation)
- Kavyan, a group of Malaysian writers of Indian descent
- Kavya's Diary, a 2009 Indian film
- Kavyamela, a 1965 Indian film
- Kavyamata, mother of Hindu sage Shukra
- Kakawin, long narrative poems in Old Javanese, the term derives from the Sanskrit Kāvya
