= Gawi =

Gawi may refer to:

- Gawi Rural LLG, local-level government (LLG) of East Sepik Province, Papua New Guinea
- Nightmare (2000 film) (가위; Gawi), South Korean film
- Gau (territory) (Gothic: Gawi), Germanic term for a region
- Gawi, a dialect of the Mser language in Cameroon and Chad

== See also ==
- Gawis, settlement in Sarawak, Malaysia
- Kawi (disambiguation)
