= Anjou =

Anjou may refer to:

== Geography and titles ==
=== France ===
- County of Anjou, a historical county in France and predecessor of the Duchy of Anjou
  - Count of Anjou, title of nobility
- Duchy of Anjou, a historical duchy and later a province of France
  - Duke of Anjou, title of nobility
- By extension, the Maine-et-Loire department, which corresponds roughly to the southern portion of the historical Anjou province and is sometimes informally called by that name
- Anjou, Isère, a commune

=== Other countries ===
- Anjou, Quebec, Canada, a borough of Montreal
  - Anjou (electoral district)
- Anjou Islands, a group of the New Siberian Islands

== Food ==
- Anjou (grape), another name for the French wine grape Chenin blanc
- Anjou wine, a wine region in the Loire Valley
- D'Anjou or Anjou pear

== Other uses ==
- Anjou (ship), wrecked in 1905

== See also ==
- Angevin (disambiguation), meaning "of Anjou"
- Anjo (disambiguation)
- Anju (disambiguation)
