= Anjali =

Añjali (Devanagari: अञ्जलि) is a Sanskrit word that means "salutation" or "reverence".

== People ==
=== Actors ===
- Anjali (actress) (born 1986), Indian actress
- Anjali Abrol (born 1990), Indian actress
- Anjali Bhimani, Indian-American actress
- Anjali Devi (1927–2014), Indian actress and producer
- Anjali Jay (born 1975), English actress
- Anjali Lavania (born 1986), Indian actress and model
- Anjali Patil (born 1987), Indian actress
- Anjali Sudhakar (born 1972), Indian actress
- Anjali Nair (born 1988), Indian actress and politician

=== In other arts ===
- Anjali Joseph (born 1978), British-Indian author, journalist, and teacher
- Anjali Lavania (born 1986), Indian actress and model
- Anjali Mendes (1946–2010), Indian fashion model
- Anjali Ranadivé (born 1992), Indian singer-songwriter and marine conservationist
- Anjali Menon, Indian film director and screenwriter

=== In sport ===
- Anjali Bhagwat (born 1969), Indian shooter
- Anjali Forber-Pratt (born 1984), American wheelchair racer
- Anjali Pendharker (born 1959), Indian cricketer
- Anjali Sharma (cricketer) (born 1956), Indian cricketer

=== In other fields ===
- Anjali Damania, Indian anti-corruption activist and politician
- Anjali Gopalan (born 1957), Indian human and animal rights activist
- Anjali Gupta (1975–2011), former officer in the Indian Air Force
- Anjali Nimbalkar, Indian politician
- Anjali Sharma (climate activist) (born 2004), Australian environmentalist
- Anjali Sud, Indian American businesswoman and CEO of Tubi and former CEO of Vimeo

== Other uses ==
- Anjali (2006 TV series), an Indian Tamil-language soap opera
- Anjali (2019 TV series), a Tamil-language television soap opera
- "Anjali", a song by Vandemataram Srinivas and Hariharan from the 2001 Indian film Ammayi Kosam
- Añjali Mudrā, a hand gesture which consists of putting the palms together in front of the chest
- Anjali Pictures, an Indian film production company
- Anjali Raichand, a fictional character in the 2001 Indian film Kabhi Khushi Kabhi Gham, portrayed by Kajol

== See also ==
- Anjala (disambiguation)
- Anju (disambiguation)
- Kavyanjali (disambiguation)
- Anjolie Ela Menon (born 1940), Indian artist
- Anjuli Shukla, Indian cinematographer and director
