= Tomio Mizokami =

Japanese professor

- 溝上富夫
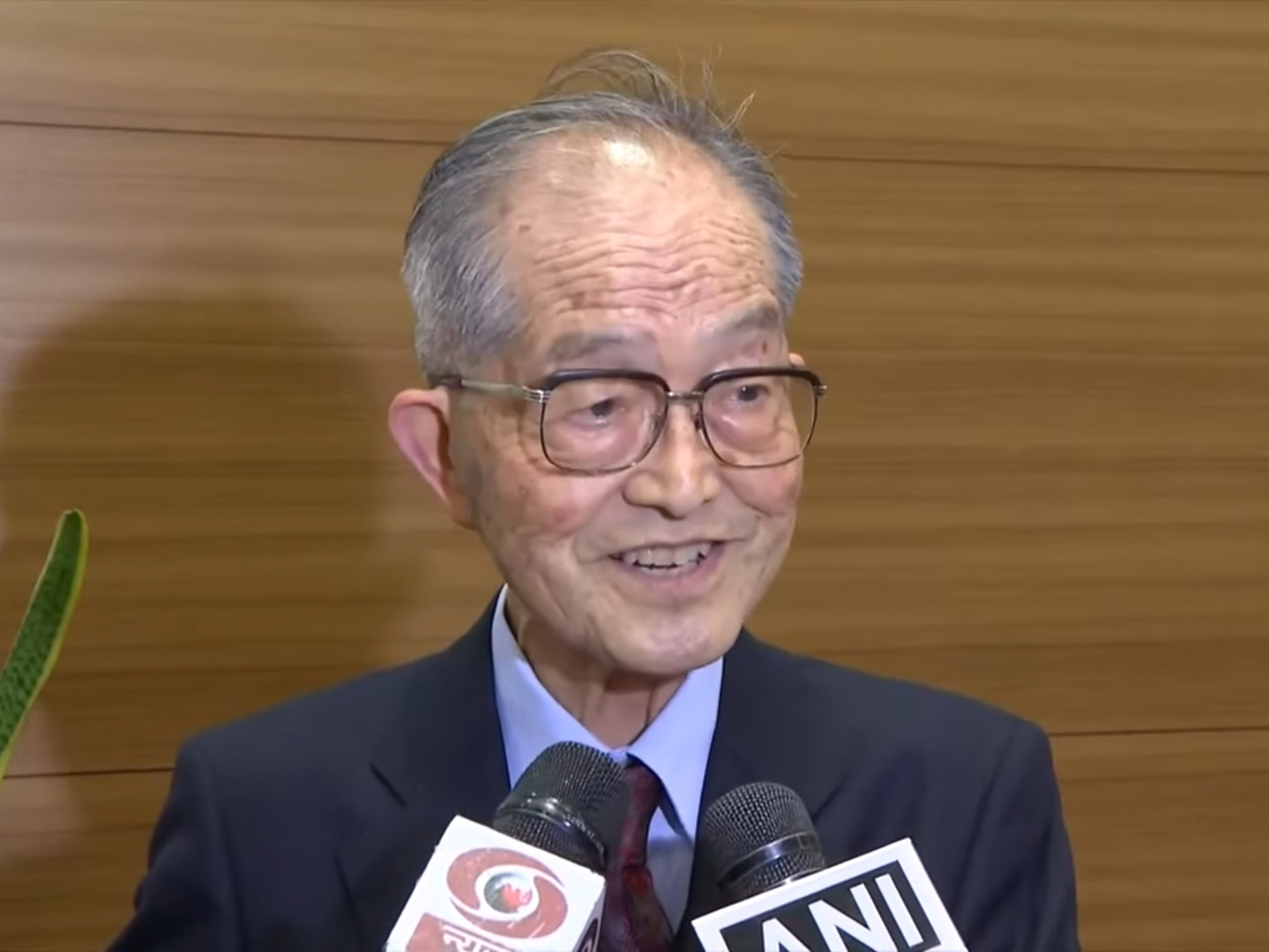
- Born: 1941 (age 84–85); Kobe, Japan
- Citizenship: Japan
- Education: P. hd.
- Alma mater: Delhi University
- Occupation: Professor
- Awards: Padma Shri (2018)

Tomio Mizokami (Japanese: 溝上富夫; born 1941) is a professor Emeritus of Osaka University, Japan. In 2018, he was conferred the Padma Sri by the President of India, at the Civil Investiture Ceremony on 2 April 2018, for his contribution to the fields of literature and education.

== Education ==
He was born in 1941 in Kobe, Japan. In 1965, he graduated from the Department of Indian studies at Osaka University of Foreign Studies. During 1965–1968, he studied Hindi in Allahabad and Bengali in Vishva Bharati. He became a research assistant in 1968 at the Hindi Department of Osaka University of Foreign Studies. In 1972, he earned his PhD from the Department of Modern Indian Languages at the University of Delhi. In 1983, Mizokami did his PhD from University of Delhi on Language Contact in Punjab-A sociolinguistic Study of Migrants' Language.

== Career ==
Between June and August 1994, he taught Punjabi at the University of California, Berkeley as part of their summer intensive course. He retired as a professor of Indian languages at the Osaka University, Japan. Post his retirement, he has been a professor Emeritus at the same university since 2007, teaching Foreign Studies. His language proficiency includes English, Hindi, Punjabi, Bengali, Urdu, Gujarati, Asamiya, Marathi, Kashmiri, Sindhi, Tamil, German, and French. He translated Japji Sahib, a Sikh prayer into Japanese, and he is the first Japanese-Punjabi researcher. His Japji Sahib translation was published in 1987 in the Journal of Osaka University of Foreign Studies. In April 2026, Jvala Singh digitized Mizokami's Japji Sahib translation.

== Awards ==
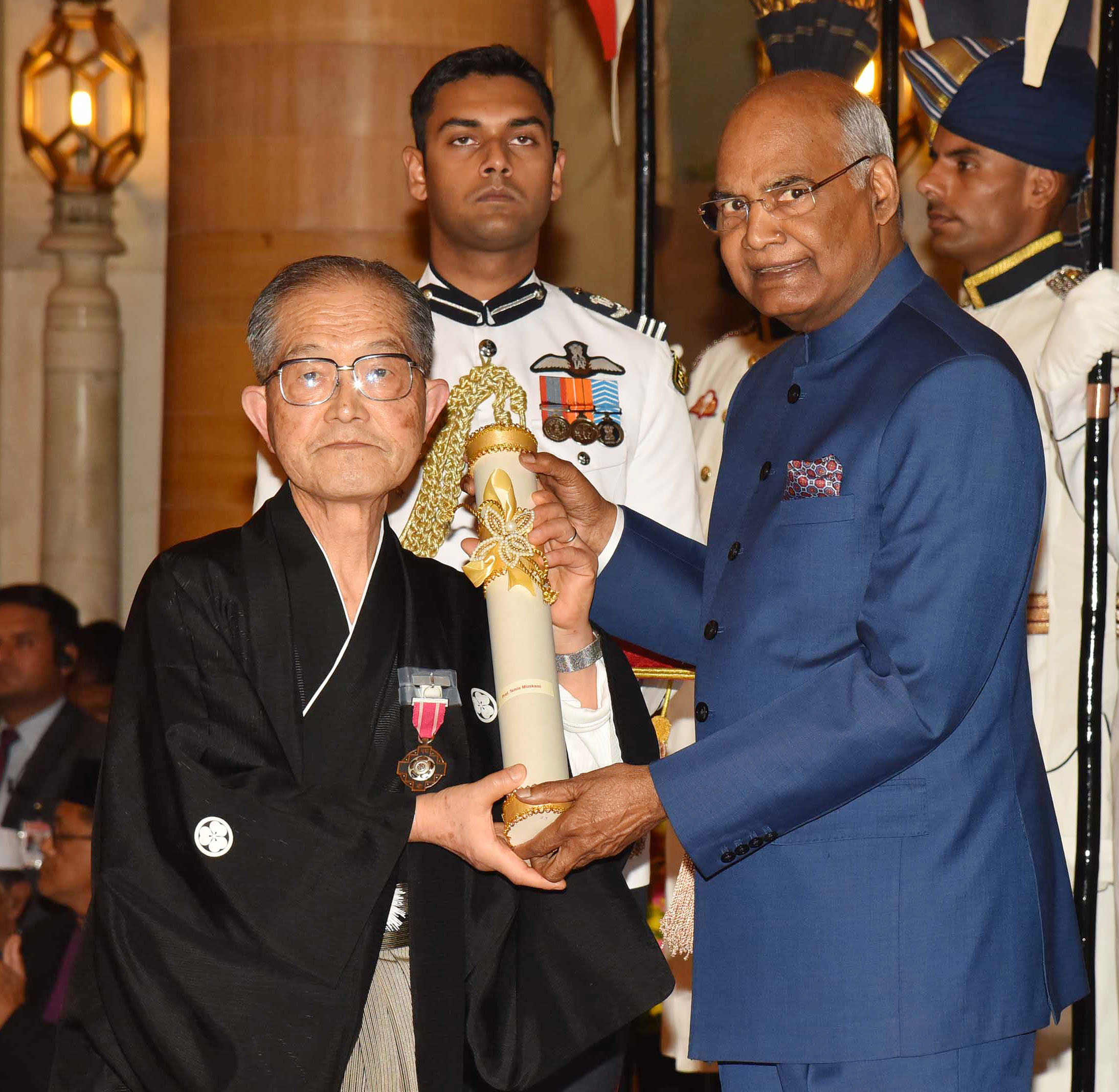
Then President, Ram Nath Kovind presenting the Padma Shri Award to Tomio Mizokami, at the Civil Investiture Ceremony-II, at Rashtrapati Bhavan, in New Delhi on 2 April 2018

In 2018, he was conferred the Padma Sri by then President of India, Ram Nath Kovind, at the Civil Investiture Ceremony on 2 April 2018 for his contribution to the fields of literature and education.

== Publications ==
- 1977 - “Bilingualism in Punjab - A Case Study in Lyallpur City - “Journal of Indian and Buddhist Studies, Tokyo, Vol. XXVI, No. 2
- 1980 - “Linguistic Outline of Fatehabad” & “Sociolinguistic Change among Migrants in Jalandhar,” Rural-Urban Migration And Pattern of Employment in India, Osaka
- 1981 - PUNJABI Asian and African Grammatical Manual No.13e, Tokyo
- 1983 - Introductory Punjabi, Tokyo
- 1983 - Punjabi Reader, Tokyo
- 1984 - Language Contact in Punjab [A Sociolinguistic Study of the Migrants’ Language], New Delhi, Bahri Publications
- 1985 - Practical Punjabi Conversation, Tokyo
- 1985 - Basic 1500 Punjabi Vocabularies, Tokyo
- 1989 - ”Some Orthographical Problems in Punjabi,” A Computer-assisted Study of South-Asian Languages Annual Report No.1, Tokyo
- 1992 - “Punjabi” & “Lahnda”, World Languages Dictionary, edited by Eiichi Chino, Takashi Kamei & Rokoro Kouno, Sanseido, Tokyo
- 2004 - “Status of Research in Bangla and Punjabi Literatures in Japan,” pp 323–335
- 2004 - “Language Teaching and Cultural Interchange through the medium of Hindi Drama,” pp 341–348, Imaging India Imaging Japan: A Chronicle of Reflections on Mutual Literature, Edited by Unita Sachidanand & Teiji Sakata, Manak Publications, Delhi

=== Translations ===
- Mizokami, Tomio (1987). "`Japujī'(kōgo-yaku)" 「ジャプジー」(口語訳) ["Japuji" (Colloquial Translation)]. Journal of Osaka University of Foreign Studies [『大阪外国語大学学報』第75-1.2号(1987)所載] (in Japanese). 75 (1.2): 65–87., translation of Guru Nanak's Japji Sahib composition into Japanese
- Translated The Sikhs: Their Religious Beliefs and Practices, by Owen Cole & Piara Singh Sambhi, into Japanese

== See also ==
- Sikhism in Japan
