= Indian philosophy =

Philosophical traditions of the Indian subcontinent

Indian philosophical traditions
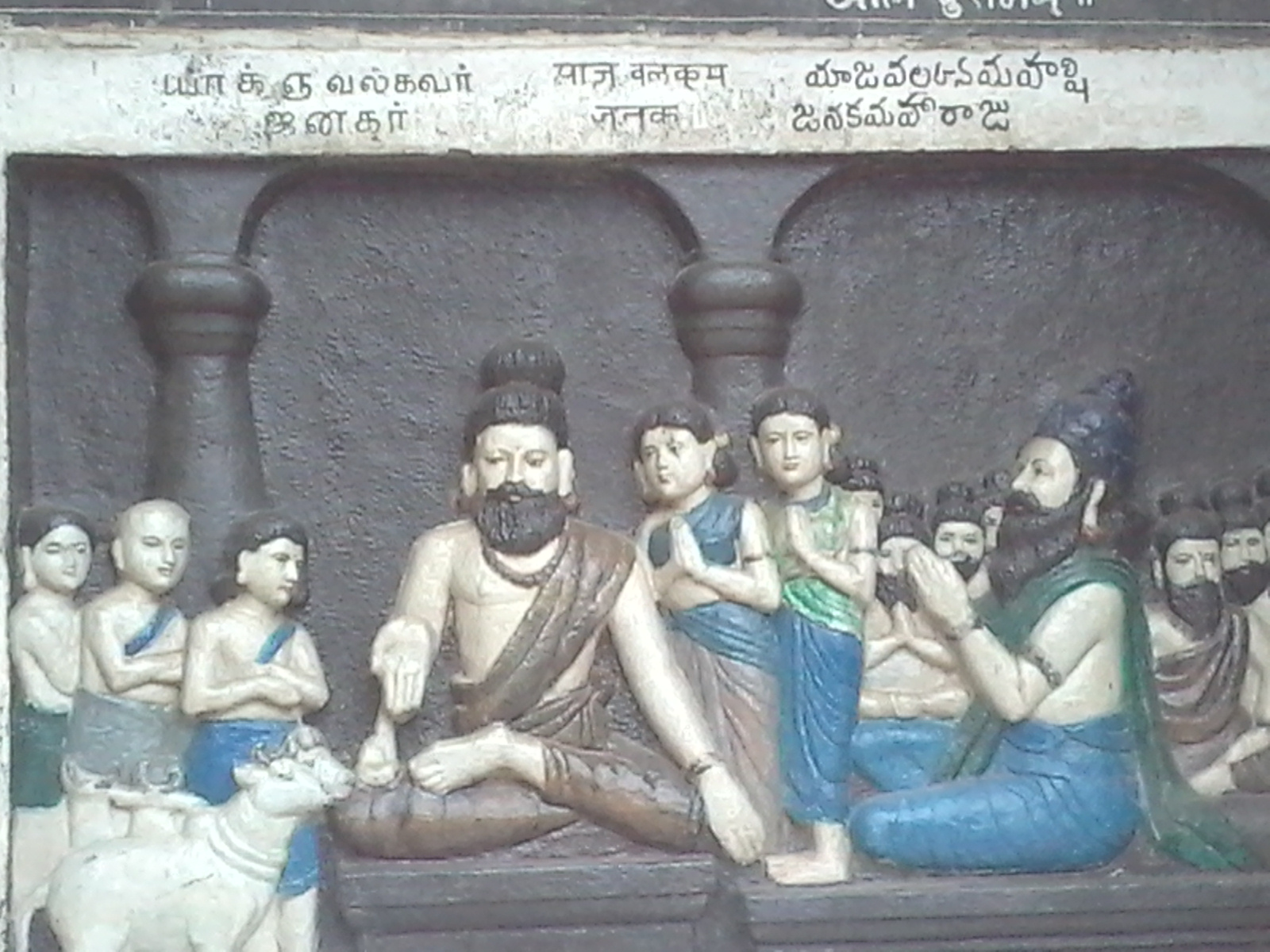
Yajnavalkya (c. 8th century BCE), an important Vedic sage associated with the thought of the early Upanishads.

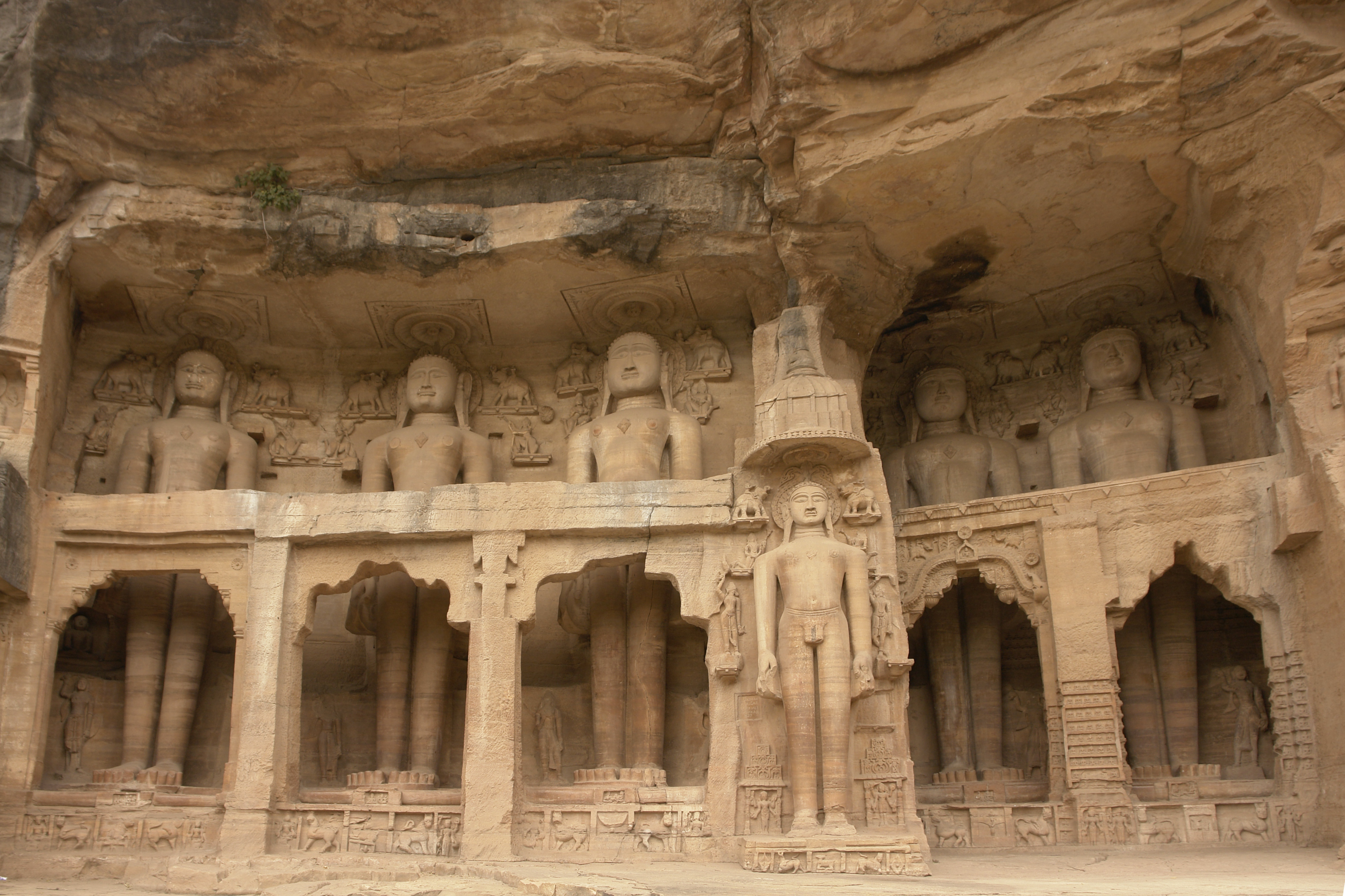
Jain philosophy was propagated by Tirthankaras, notably Parshvanatha (c. 872 – c. 772 BCE) and Mahavira (c. 599-527 BCE).

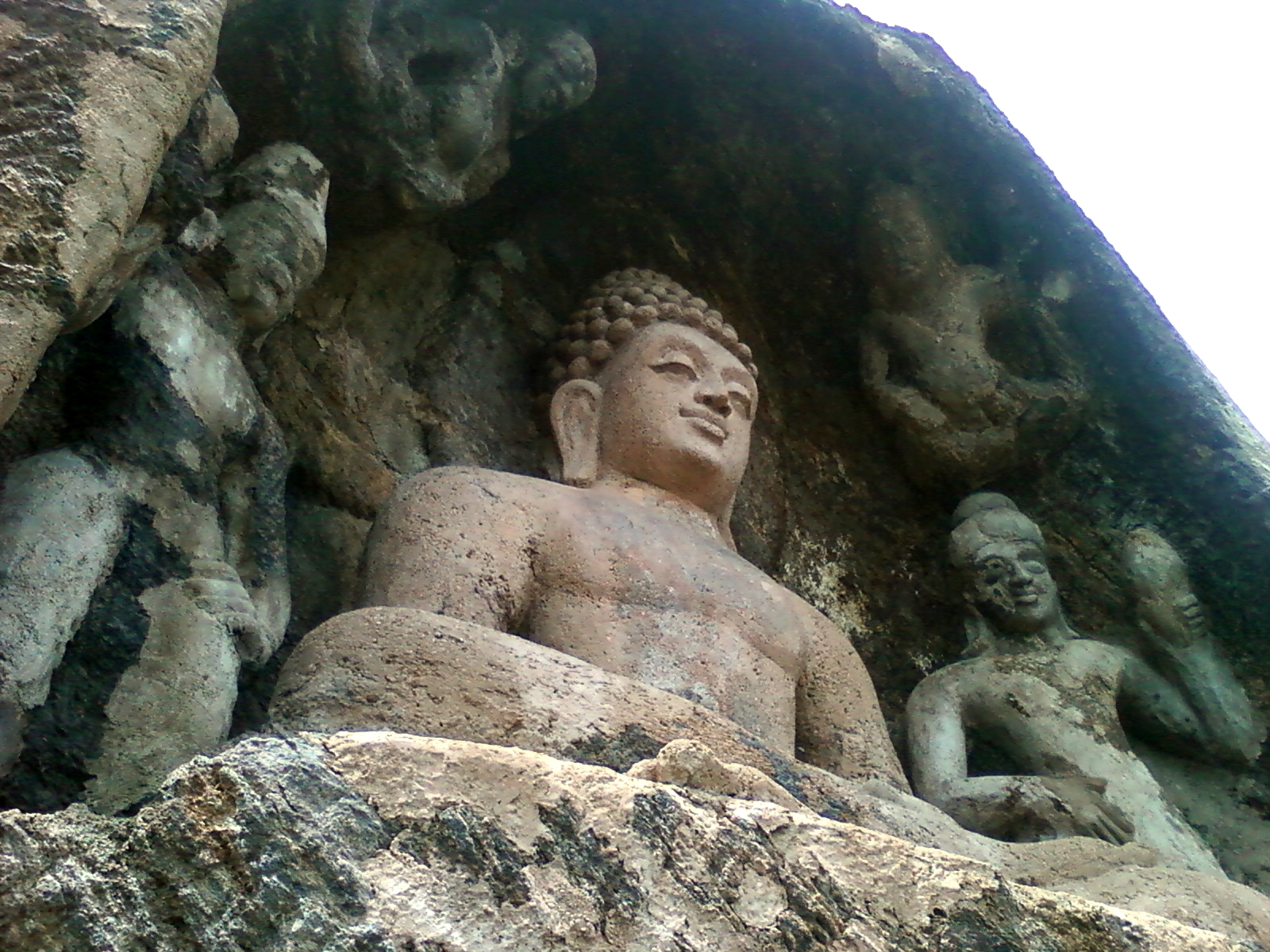
Buddhist philosophy was founded by Gautama Buddha (c. 563–483 BCE).

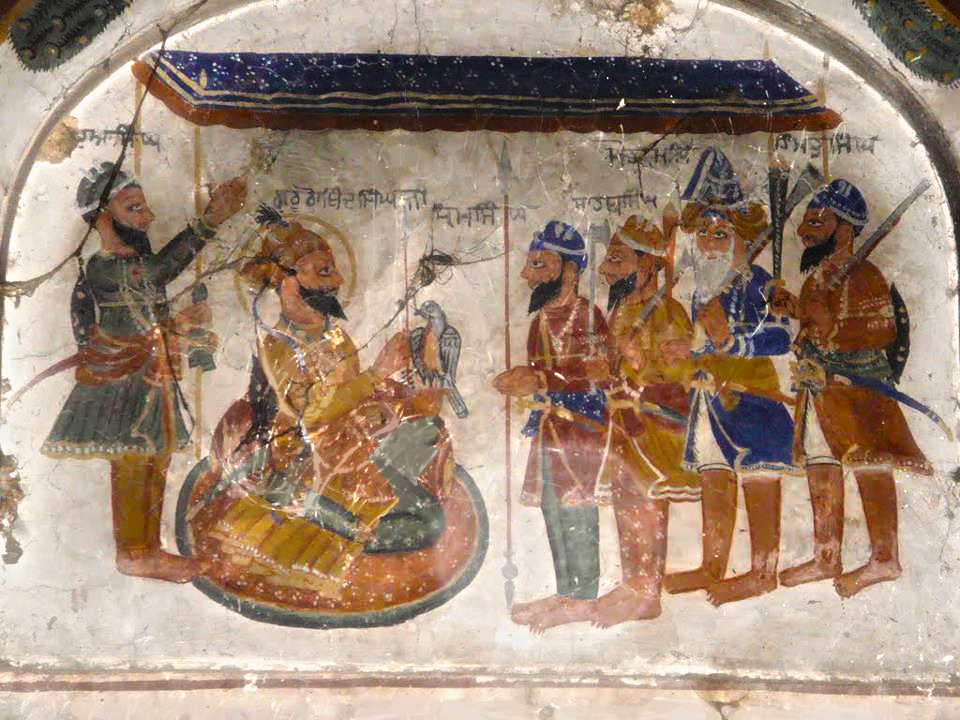
Sikh philosophy was developed by Guru Gobind Singh (c. 1666–1708 CE).

Indian philosophy is the diverse set of philosophical traditions of the Indian subcontinent. Each of the traditions is called a darshan, meaning "too see" or "looking at". Ānvīkṣikī means "critical inquiry" or "investigation". Unlike darshan, ānvīkṣikī was used to refer to Indian philosophies by classical Indian philosophers, such as Kautilya in the Arthaśāstra.

A prominent classification divides Indian philosophical schools into āstika and nāstika categories, based on whether they accept the Vedas as an authoritative source of knowledge, affirm the existence of Brahman and Atman, or believe in an afterlife and Devas.

There are six major (āstika) schools of Vedic philosophy—Nyāya, Vaisheshika, Samkhya, Yoga, Mīmāṃsā and Vedanta—and five major non-Vedic or heterodox (nāstika or sramanic) schools—Jain, Buddhist, Ajivika, Ajñana, and Charvaka. The āstika group embraces the Vedas as an essential source of its foundations, while the nāstika group does not. However, there are other methods of classification; Vidyaranya for instance identifies sixteen schools of Indian philosophy by including those that belong to the Śaiva and Raseśvara traditions.

The main schools of Indian philosophy were formalised and recognised chiefly between 500 BCE and the late centuries of the Common Era. Some schools like Jainism, Buddhism, Yoga, Śaiva and Vedanta survived, but others, like Ajñana, Charvaka and Ājīvika did not.

Ancient and medieval era texts of Indian philosophies include extensive discussions on ontology (metaphysics, Brahman-Atman, Sunyata-Anatta), reliable means of knowledge (epistemology, pramāṇas), value system (axiology) and other topics.

== Common themes ==
Indian philosophies share many concepts such as dharma, karma, samsara, dukkha, renunciation, meditation, with almost all of them focusing on the ultimate goal of liberation of the individual from dukkha and samsara through diverse range of spiritual practices (moksha, nirvana). While many sutra texts explicitly mention that the work leads to moksha, Indian philosophy is not exclusively concerned with moksha.

They differ in their assumptions about the nature of existence as well as the specifics of the path to the ultimate liberation, resulting in numerous schools that disagreed with each other. Their ancient doctrines span the diverse range of philosophies found in other ancient cultures.

== Hindu traditions ==
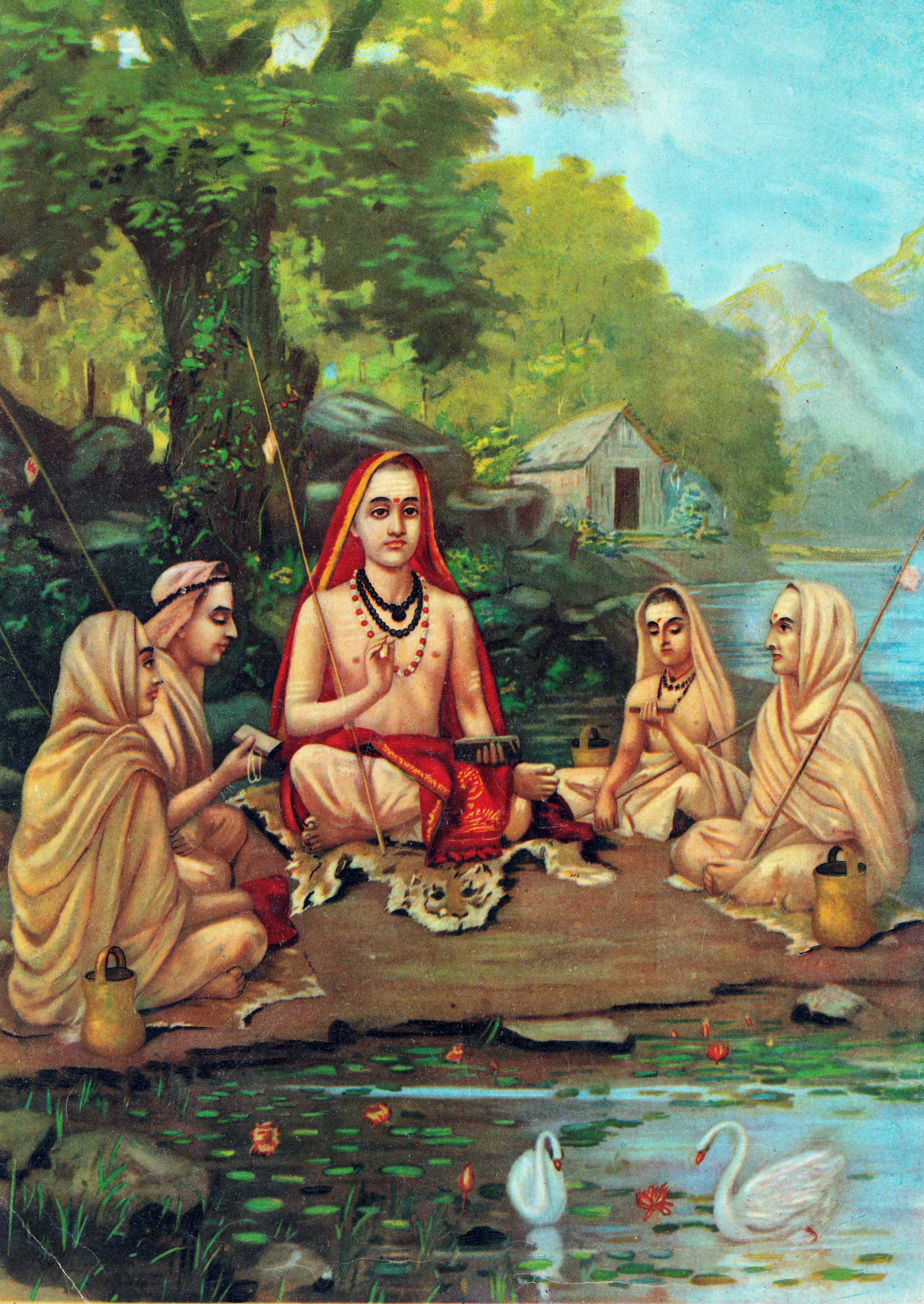
Hindu philosophy has a diversity of traditions and numerous saints and scholars, such as Adi Shankara of Advaita Vedanta school.

Some of the earliest surviving Indian philosophical texts are the Upanishads of the later Vedic period (1000–500 BCE), which are considered to preserve the ideas of Brahmanism. Indian philosophical traditions are commonly grouped according to their relationship to the Vedas and the ideas contained in them. The origins of Jainism remain enigmatic, with scholarly consensus divided between pre-Vedic roots, parallel development alongside Vedic civilization or post-Vedic emergence. The historical presence of its 23rd Tirthankara, Parshvanatha in the 8th-7th century BCE provides one of the earliest anchors of the tradition. Despite the accepted historicity of Parshvanath, the historical claims such as the link between him and Mahavira, whether Mahavira renounced in the ascetic tradition of Parshvanatha, and other biographical details have led to different scholarly conclusions. Doubts about Parshvanatha's historicity are also supported by the oldest Jain texts, which present Mahavira with sporadic mentions of ancient ascetics and teachers without specific names (such as sections 1.4.1 and 1.6.3 of the Acaranga Sutra). Even the early archaeological finds, such as the statues and reliefs near Mathura, lack iconography such as lions and serpents. Buddhism also originated at the end of the Vedic period. These traditions drew upon already established Brahmanical concepts, states Wiltshire, to communicate their own distinct doctrines.

Hindu philosophy classify Indian philosophical traditions as either orthodox (āstika) or heterodox (nāstika), depending on whether they accept the authority of the Vedas and the theories of brahman and ātman found therein. Besides these, the "heterodox" schools that do not accept the authority of the Vedas include Buddhism, Jainism, Ajivika and Charvaka. According to P.T. Raju, whilst heterodox schools rejected the label 'Vaidika' (derived from the Veda) due to a rejection of Vedic sacrifice, they accepted a broader term of 'Aryadharma' which also encompassed Hindu philosophies.

This orthodox-heterodox terminology is a scholarly construct found in later Indian sources (and in Western sources on Indian thought) and not all of these sources agree on which system should be considered "orthodox". As such there are various heresiological systems in Indian philosophy. Some traditions see "orthodox" as a synonym for "theism" and "heterodox" as a synonym for atheism. Other Hindu sources argue that certain systems of Shaiva tantra should be considered heterodox due to its deviations from the Vedic tradition.

One of the most common list of Hindu orthodox schools is the "six philosophies" (ṣaḍ-darśana), which are:

- Sāṃkhya (school of "Enumeration"), a philosophical tradition which regards the universe as consisting of two independent realities: puruṣa (the perceiving consciousness) and prakṛti (perceived reality, including mind, perception, kleshas, and matter) and which describes a soteriology based on this duality, in which purush is discerned and disentangled from the impurities of prakriti. It has included atheistic authors as well as some theistic thinkers, and forms the basis of much of subsequent Indian philosophy.
- Yoga, a school similar to Sāṃkhya (or perhaps even a branch of it) which accepts a personal god and focuses on yogic practice (consisting of mental and physical acts) as a means for liberation.
- Nyāya (the "Logic" school), a philosophy which focuses on logic and epistemology. It accepts four kinds of pramāṇa (valid presentation): (1) perception, (2) inference, (3) comparison or analogy, (4) word or testimony. Nyāya defends a form of direct realism and a theory of substances (dravya).
- Vaiśeṣika (the school of "Characteristics"), closely related to the Nyāya school, this tradition focused on the metaphysics of substance, and on defending a theory of atoms. Unlike Nyāya, they only accept two pramāṇas: perception and inference.
- Pūrva-Mīmāṃsā (the school of "Prior Investigation" [of the Vedas]), a school which focuses on exegesis of the Vedas, philology and the interpretation of Vedic ritual.
- Vedānta ("the end of the Vedas", also called Uttara Mīmāṃsā), focuses on interpreting the philosophy of the Upanishads, particularly the soteriological and metaphysical ideas relating to Atman and Brahman.

Sometimes these six are coupled into three groups for both historical and conceptual reasons: Nyāya-Vaiśeṣika, Sāṃkhya-Yoga, and Mīmāṃsā-Vedānta. Each tradition also included different currents and sub-schools. For example, Vedānta was divided into the sub-schools of Advaita (non-dualism), Visishtadvaita (qualified non-dualism), Dvaita (dualism), Dvaitadvaita (dualistic non-dualism), Suddhadvaita (pure non-dualism), and Achintya Bheda Abheda (inconceivable oneness and difference).

The doctrines of the Vedas and Upanishads were interpreted differently by these six schools, with varying degrees of overlap. They represent a "collection of philosophical views that share a textual connection", according to Monima Chadha. They also reflect a tolerance for a diversity of philosophical interpretations within Hinduism while sharing the same foundation.

Hindu philosophers of the orthodox schools developed systems of epistemology (pramāṇa) and investigated topics such as metaphysics, ethics, psychology (guṇa), hermeneutics, and soteriology within the framework of the Vedic knowledge, while presenting a diverse collection of interpretations. The commonly named six orthodox schools were the competing philosophical traditions of what has been called the "Hindu synthesis" of classical Hinduism.

All these systems are not the only "orthodox" systems of philosophy, as numerous sub-schools developed throughout the history of Hindu thought. They are however the most well known Hindu philosophical traditions.

In addition to the six systems, the Hindu philosopher Vidyāraṇya (ca. 1374–1380) also includes several further Hindu philosophical systems in his Sarva-darśana-saṃgraha (A Compendium of all the Philosophical Systems):

- Paśupata, a school of Shaivism founded by Nakulisa
- Shaiva Siddhantha, a theistic and dualistic school of Shaivism, which is influenced by Samkhya, and expands the Samkhya system further.
- Pratyabhijña (the school of "Recognition"), which defends an idealistic monism and part of the Kashmir Shaivism tradition of Tantric Shaivism
- Pāṇini Darśana, a tradition focusing on Sanskrit linguistics and grammar which also developed the theory of sphoṭavāda under Bhartṛhari, a theory which places speech and sound at the center of its metaphysics.
- Raseśvara, an alchemical school which advocated the use of mercury as a way to attain enlightenment.

== Śramaṇic traditions ==
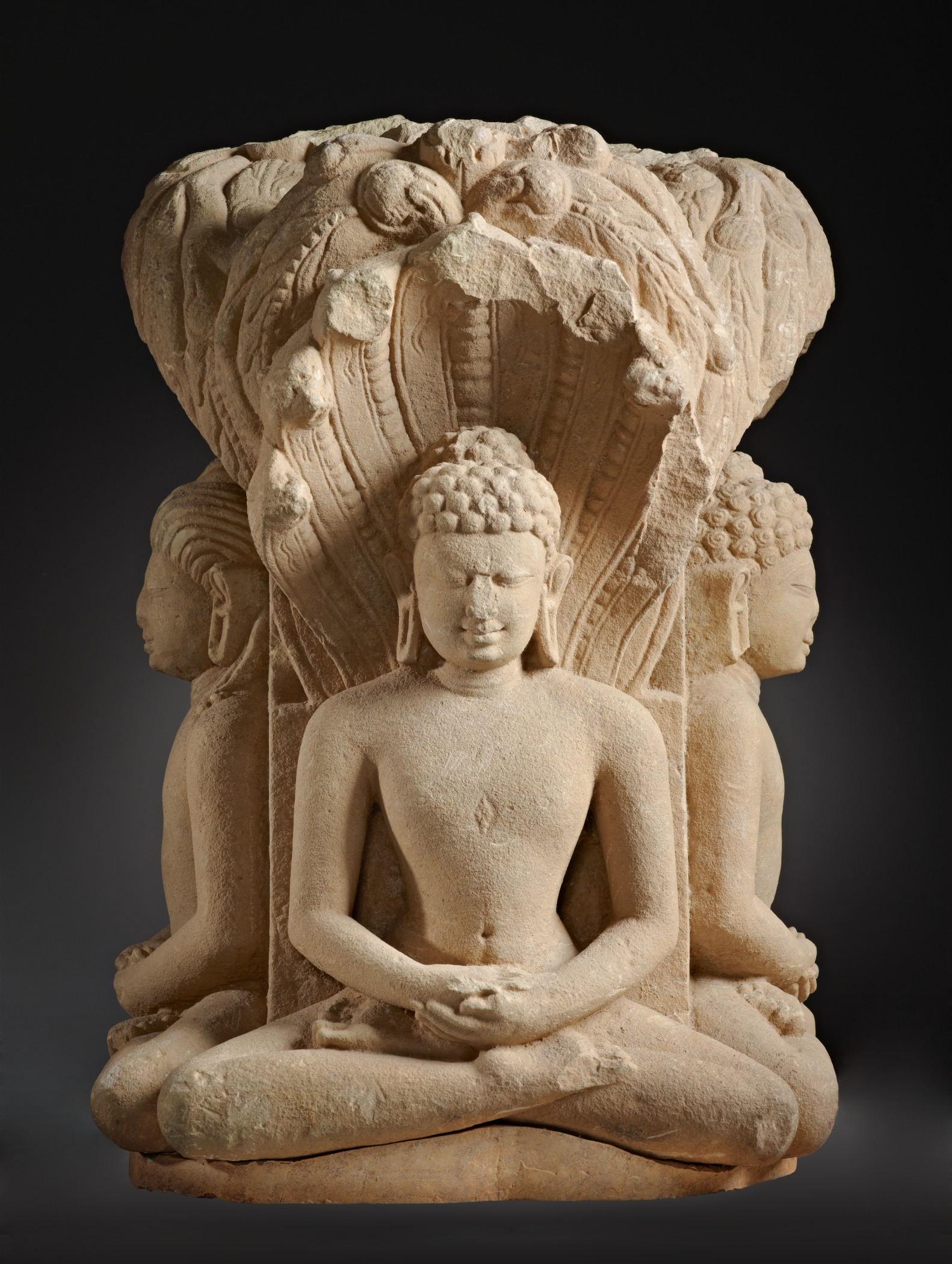
Parshvanatha led the shramana order in 9th century BCE

Several non-Vedic traditions of thought also flourished in ancient India and developed their own philosophical systems. The Śramaṇas included various traditions which did not accept the Brahmanical religion of the Vedas. These non-Vedic schools gave rise to a diverse range of ideas about topics like the atman, atomism, ethics, materialism, atheism, agnosticism, free will, asceticism, family life, ahimsa (non-violence) and vegetarianism. Notable philosophies that were a part of Śramaṇa family were Jainism, early Buddhism, Charvaka, Ajñana and Ājīvika.

The Indian Śramaṇa tradition had one of its earliest known prominent exemplar in Parshvanatha, the 23rd Tirthankar in 9th century BCE. It became prominent in the 5th and 4th centuries BCE, and even more so during the Mauryan period (c. 322–184 BCE). Jainism and Buddhism were especially influential. These traditions influenced all later forms of Indian philosophy who either adopted some of their ideas or reacted against them.

=== Jain philosophy ===
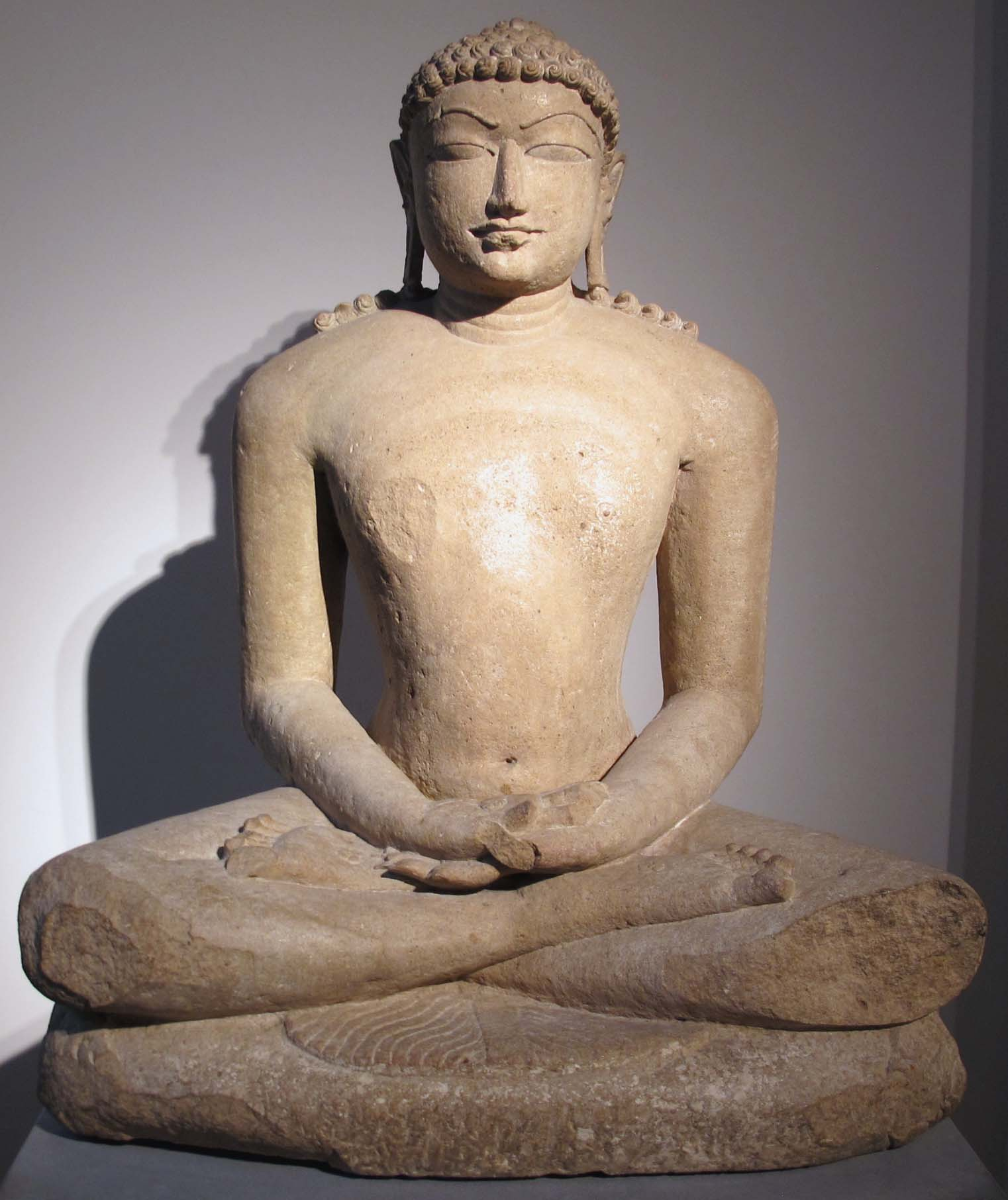
Rishabhadeva, believed to have lived over a million years ago, is considered the founder of Jain religion in the present time cycle.

Jain philosophy is the oldest Indian philosophy that separates body (matter) from the soul (consciousness) completely. Each individual soul is inherently endowed with infinite knowledge and boundless bliss. However, since infinity its true nature has remained veiled by ignorance, causing it to mistakenly identify with the physical body. This misidentification leads to suffering and the accumulation of karma. As karma accumulates, the soul becomes bound to the cycle of birth and rebirth, perpetuating a continuous cycle of suffering and ignorance, until it ultimately attains liberation through self-realization (atma-anubhuti). Jainism lays down the path for the soul to realize its true nature through right faith and active awareness of the self (bhedvigyān) as an unchanging eternal gnāta (knower) and drashtā (witness) distinct from its worldly activities like thoughts, passions, etc.

According to Jain tradition, Mahavira, the 24th Tirthankara, revitalized and unified the ancient teachings of the Śramaṇic tradition, originally established by Rishabhadeva, the first Jain Tirthankara, millions of years prior. Historians outside of the Jain tradition date Mahavira to the 6th century BCE, roughly contemporaneous with the Buddha. This timeline would place the historical Parshvanatha approximately 250 years earlier, in the 9th century BCE.

Jainism is a Śramaṇic religion and rejects the authority of the Vedas. However, like all Indian religions, it shares the core concepts such as karma, ethical living, rebirth, samsara and moksha. Jainism places strong emphasis on asceticism, ahimsa (non-violence) and anekantavada (relativity of viewpoints) as a means of spiritual liberation, ideas that influenced other Indian traditions.

Jainism strongly upholds the individualistic nature of soul, holding that self-reliance and individual efforts alone are responsible for liberation. According to the Jain philosophy, the world (Saṃsāra) is characterized by hiṃsā (violence). Therefore, one should direct all efforts towards the attainment of Ratnatraya, which consists of Samyak Darshan (right perception), Samyak Gnana (right knowledge) and Samyak Chàritra (right conduct), the key requisites to attain liberation.

=== Buddhist philosophy ===
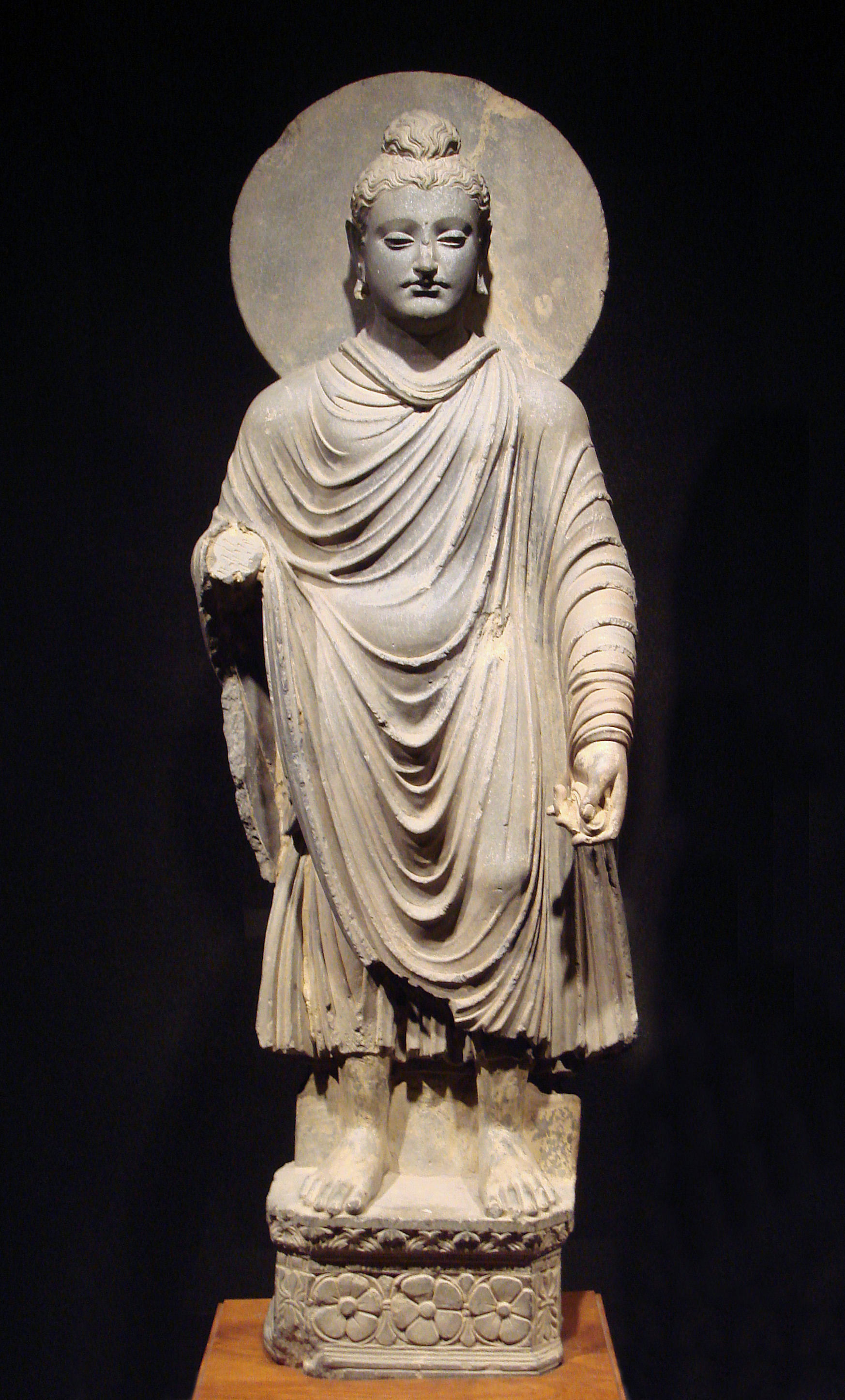
The Buddhist philosophy is based on the teachings of the Buddha.

Buddhist philosophy refers to several traditions which can be traced back to the teachings of Siddhartha Gautama, the Buddha ("awakened one"). Buddhism is a Śramaṇa religion, but it contains novel ideas not found or accepted by other Śramaṇa religions, such as the Buddhist doctrine of not-self (anatta). Buddhist thought is also influenced by the thought of the Upanishads.

Buddhism and Hinduism mutually influenced each other and shared many concepts, however it is now difficult to identify and describe these influences. Buddhism rejected the Vedic concepts of Brahman (ultimate reality) and Atman (soul, self) at the foundation of Hindu philosophies.

Buddhism shares many philosophical views with other Indian systems, such as belief in karma – a cause-and-effect relationship, samsara – ideas about cyclic afterlife and rebirth, dharma – ideas about ethics, duties and values, impermanence of all material things and of body, and possibility of spiritual liberation (nirvana or moksha). A major departure from Hindu and Jain philosophy is the Buddhist rejection of an eternal soul (atman) in favour of anatta (non-Self). After the death of the Buddha, several competing philosophical systems termed Abhidharma began to emerge as ways to systematize Buddhist philosophy.

==== Schools of thought ====
The main traditions of Buddhist philosophy in India (from 300 BCE to 1000 CE) can be divided into Mahayana schools and non-Mahayana schools (sometimes called Śrāvakayāna schools, Nikaya Buddhism, "Mainstream" Buddhism or Hinayana, "inferior" or "lesser" vehicle, a term used only in Mahayana to refer to non-Mahayana traditions). The Mahayana schools accepted the Mahayana sutras and studied the works of Mahayana philosophers like Nagarjuna. The non-Mahayana schools drew their philosophical doctrines from the Tripitaka and on the Abhidharma treatises.

Śrāvakayāna schools (non-Mahayana):

- The Mahāsāṃghika ("Great Community") tradition (which included numerous sub-schools, all are now extinct). A key doctrine of this tradition was the supramundane and transcendent nature of the Buddha (lokottaravada).
- The schools of the Sthavira ("Elders") tradition:
  - Vaibhāṣika ("Commentators") also known as the Sarvāstivāda-Vaibhāśika, was an Abhidharma tradition that composed the "Great Commentary" (Mahāvibhāṣa). They were known for their defense of the doctrine of "sarvāstitva" (all exists), which is a form of eternalism regarding the philosophy of time. They also supported direct realism and a theory of substances (svabhāva).
  - Sautrāntika ("Those who uphold the sutras"), a tradition which did not see the northern Abhidharma as authoritative, and instead focused on the Buddhist sutras. They disagreed with the Vaibhāṣika on several key points, including their eternalistic theory of time, their direct realism and their realist theory of nirvana.
  - Pudgalavāda ("Personalists"), which were known for their controversial theory of the "person" (pudgala) which is what undergoes rebirth and attain awakening. They are now extinct.
  - Vibhajyavāda ("The Analysts"), a widespread tradition which reached Kashmir, South India and Sri Lanka. A part of this school has survived into the modern era as the Southeast Asian Theravada tradition. Their orthodox positions can be found in the Kathavatthu. They rejected the views of the Pudgalavāda and of the Vaibhāṣika among others.

Mahāyāna traditions:

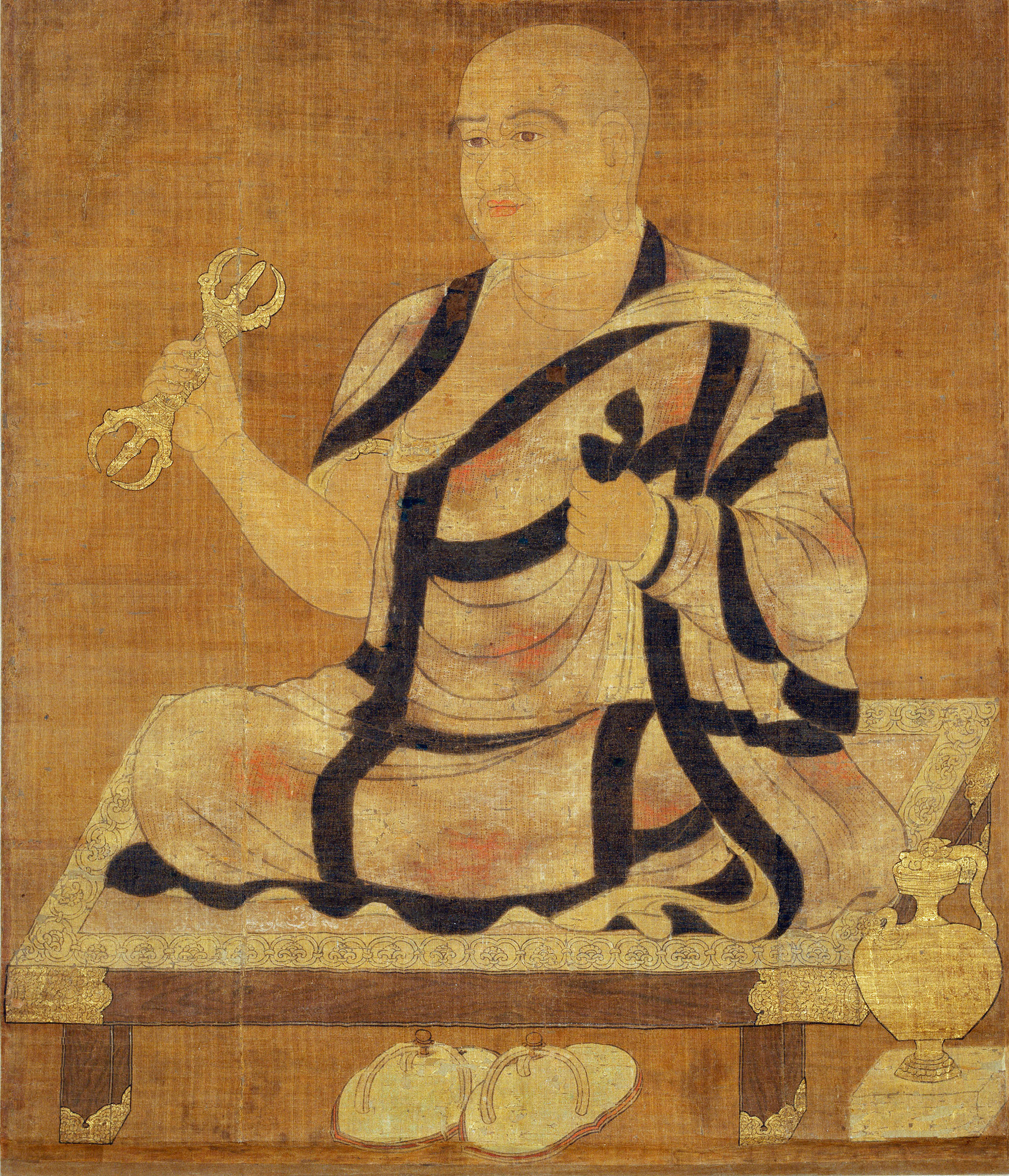
A Japanese depiction of Nagarjuna, one of the greatest Buddhist philosophers and founder of Madhyamaka

The Mahāyāna ("Great Vehicle") movement (c. 1st century BCE onwards) included new ideas and scriptures (Mahayana sutras). These philosophical traditions differ significantly from other schools of Buddhism, and include metaphysical doctrines which are not accepted by the other Buddhist traditions. Mahayana thought focuses on the universal altruistic ideal of the bodhisattva, a being who is on the path to Buddhahood for the sake of all living beings. It also defends the doctrine that there are limitless number of Buddhas throughout limitless numbers of universes. These Indian traditions are the main source of modern Tibetan Buddhism and of modern East Asian Buddhism.

The main Indian Mahayana schools of philosophy are:

- Madhyamaka ("Middle way" or "Centrism") founded by Nagarjuna. Also known as Śūnyavāda (the emptiness doctrine) and Niḥsvabhāvavāda (the no svabhāva doctrine), this tradition focuses on the idea that all phenomena are empty of any essence or substance (svabhāva).
- Yogācāra ("Yoga-praxis"), an idealistic school which held that only consciousness exists, and thus was also known as Vijñānavāda (the doctrine of consciousness).
- The Dignāga-Dharmakīrti tradition is an influential school of thought which focused on epistemology, or pramāṇa ('means of knowledge'). They generally followed the doctrine of Vijñānavāda.
- Some scholars see the Tathāgatagarbha ("Buddha womb/source") or "buddha-nature" texts as constituting a third "school" of Indian Mahāyāna thought.
- Vajrayāna (also known as Mantrayāna, Tantrayāna, Secret Mantra, and Tantric Buddhism) is often placed in a separate category due to its unique tantric theories and practices.

Many of these philosophies were brought to other regions, like Central Asia and China. After the disappearance of Buddhism from India, some of these philosophical traditions continued to develop in the Tibetan Buddhist, East Asian Buddhist and Theravada Buddhist traditions.

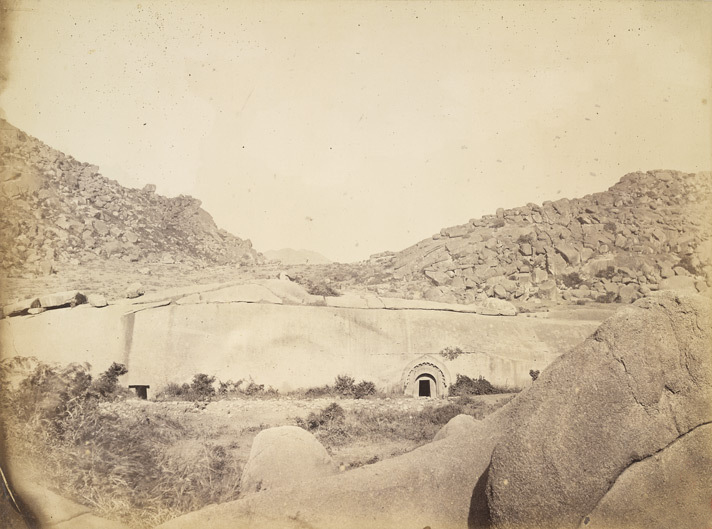
Monastic life has been a part of all Indian philosophy traditions. Mendicant caves of extinct Ājīvikas in Bihar.

=== Ājīvika philosophy ===
The philosophy of Ājīvika was founded by Makkhali Gosala, it was a Śramaṇa movement and a major rival of early Buddhism and Jainism. Ājīvikas were organised renunciates who formed discrete monastic communities prone to an ascetic and simple lifestyle.

Original scriptures of the Ājīvika school of philosophy may once have existed, but these are currently unavailable and probably lost. Their theories are extracted from mentions of Ajivikas in the secondary sources of ancient Indian literature, particularly those of Jainism and Buddhism which polemically criticized the Ajivikas. The Ājīvika school is known for its Niyati doctrine of absolute determinism (fate), the premise that there is no free will, that everything that has happened, is happening and will happen is entirely preordained and a function of cosmic principles. Ājīvika considered the karma doctrine as a fallacy. Ājīvikas were atheists and rejected the authority of the Vedas, but they believed that in every living being is an ātman – a central premise of Hinduism and Jainism.

=== Ajñana philosophy ===
Ajñana was one of the nāstika or "heterodox" schools of ancient Indian philosophy, and the ancient school of radical Indian skepticism. It was a Śramaṇa movement and a major rival of early Buddhism and Jainism. Their ideas are recorded in Buddhist and Jain texts. They held that it was impossible to obtain knowledge of metaphysical nature or ascertain the truth value of philosophical propositions; and even if knowledge was possible, it was useless and disadvantageous for final salvation. They were sophists who specialised in refutation without propagating any positive doctrine of their own.

=== Charvaka philosophy ===
Charvaka (Sanskrit: चार्वाक; IAST: Cārvāka), also known as Lokāyata, is an ancient school of Indian materialism. Charvaka holds direct perception, empiricism, and conditional inference as proper sources of knowledge, embraces philosophical skepticism and rejects ritualism and supernaturalism. It was a popular belief system in ancient India. (Note: "Aside from nontheistic schools like the Samkhya, there have also been explicitly atheistic schools in the Hindu tradition. One virulently anti-supernatural system is/was the so-called Charvaka school.")

The etymology of Charvaka (Sanskrit: चार्वाक) is uncertain. Bhattacharya quotes the grammarian Hemacandra, to the effect that the word cārvāka is derived from the root carv, 'to chew' : "A Cārvāka chews the self (carvatyātmānaṃ cārvākaḥ). Hemacandra refers to his own grammatical work, Uṇādisūtra 37, which runs as follows: mavāka-śyāmāka-vārtāka-jyontāka-gūvāka-bhadrākādayaḥ. Each of these words ends with the āka suffix and is formed irregularly". This may also allude to the philosophy's hedonistic precepts of "eat, drink, and be merry".

Brihaspati is traditionally referred to as the founder of Charvaka or Lokāyata philosophy, although some scholars dispute this. During the Hindu reformation period in the first millennium BCE, when Buddhism was established by Gautama Buddha and Jainism was re-organized by Parshvanatha, the Charvaka philosophy was well documented and opposed by both religions. Much of the primary literature of Charvaka, the Barhaspatya sutras, were lost either due to waning popularity or other unknown reasons. Its teachings have been compiled from historic secondary literature such as those found in the shastras, sutras, and the Indian epic poetry as well as in the dialogues of Gautama Buddha and from Jain literature. However, there is text that may belong to the Charvaka tradition, written by the skeptic philosopher Jayarāśi Bhaṭṭa, known as the Tattvôpaplava-siṁha, that provides information about this school, albeit unorthodox.

One of the widely studied principles of Charvaka philosophy was its rejection of inference as a means to establish valid, universal knowledge, and metaphysical truths. In other words, the Charvaka epistemology states that whenever one infers a truth from a set of observations or truths, one must acknowledge doubt; inferred knowledge is conditional.

== Comparison of Indian philosophies ==
The Indian traditions subscribed to diverse philosophies, significantly disagreeing with each other as well as orthodox Indian philosophy and its six schools of Hindu philosophy. The differences ranged from a belief that every individual has a soul (self, atman) to asserting that there is no soul, from axiological merit in a frugal ascetic life to that of a hedonistic life, from a belief in rebirth to asserting that there is no rebirth.

Comparison of ancient Indian philosophies
	Ājīvika	Early Buddhism	Mahayana Buddhism	Charvaka	Jainism	Vedanta	Samkhya/ Yoga	Nyaya/ Vaisheshika	Mimamsa
Karma	Denies	Affirms, but not everything is caused by karma. Karma is only one of the constraints. (Niyama)	Affirms	Denies	Affirms	Affirms	Affirms	Affirms	Denies
Samsara, Rebirth	Affirms	Affirms	Affirms	Denies	Affirms	Affirms	Affirms	Affirms	Denies
Ascetic life	Affirms	Affirms, but rejects extreme asceticism in favor of a more moderated version, the "Middle Way".	Affirms middle way	Denies	Affirms	Affirms as Sannyasa	Affirms as Sannyasa	Affirms as Sannyasa	Denies
Rituals, Bhakti	Affirms	Affirms, optional (Pali: Bhatti)	Affirms (Mahayana rites)	Denies	Affirms, optional	Theistic school: Affirms, optional Others: Deny	Vaishnavite and Shaivite Schools: Affirm, Others: Deny	Affirms, mandatory	
Ahimsa and Vegetarianism	Affirms	Acts of violence which are purposeful have karmic consequences. Buddhism does not explicitly prohibit ordinary people (lay people) from eating meat However, goods that contribute to or are a result of violence should not be traded.	Affirmed in numerous Mahayana sutras		Strongest proponent of non-violence; Vegetarianism to avoid violence against animals	Affirms as highest virtue, but Just War affirmed Vegetarianism encouraged, but choice left to the Hindu	Affirms as highest virtue, but Just War affirmed Vegetarianism encouraged, but choice left to the Hindu	Affirms as highest virtue, but Just War affirmed Vegetarianism encouraged, but choice left to the Hindu	Affirms as highest virtue, but Just War affirmed Vegetarianism encouraged, but choice left to the Hindu
Free will	Denies	Buddhists believe in neither absolute free will, nor determinism. It preaches a middle doctrine of dependent arising - pratītyasamutpāda.	Will is a dependent arising	Affirms	Affirms	Advaita and Vishishtadvaita: Deny through theory of vivartavada and determinism, Dvaita Vedanta: Affirms	Denies	Denies	Affirms
Maya	Affirms	Affirms (prapañca)	Affirms	Denies	Affirms	Advaita: Affirms Dvaita: Denies	Denies	Denies	Denies
Atman (Soul, Self)	Affirms	Denies	An atmavada is taught in Buddha-nature sources, but it is rejected in other Mahayana sources	Denies	Affirms	Affirms	Affirms	Affirms	Affirms
Creator god	Denies	Denies	Denies	Denies	Denies	Advaita denies a creator god and states that avidya (ignorance) is the source of creation, Dvaita: Affirm; Others: Deny	Samkhya: Denies, Yoga: Affirms	Theistic Schools: Affirm, Others: Deny	Denies
Epistemology (Pramana)	Pratyakṣa, Anumāṇa, Śabda	Pratyakṣa, Anumāṇa	Pratyakṣa, Anumāṇa	Pratyakṣa	Pratyakṣa, Anumāṇa, Śabda	Advaita Vedanta: Six; Pratyakṣa, Anumāṇa, Upamāṇa, Arthāpatti, Anupalabdi, Śabda, Dvaita and Vishishtadvaita: Three; Pratyakṣa, Anumāṇa, Śabda	Three: Pratyakṣa, Anumāṇa, Śabda	Vaisheshika: Two; Pratyakṣa, Anumāṇa, Nyaya: Four; Pratyakṣa, Anumāṇa, Upamāṇa, Śabda	Five: Pratyakṣa, Anumāṇa, Upamāṇa, Arthāpatti, Śabda
Epistemic authority	Denies: Vedas	Affirms: Tripitaka; Denies: Vedas	Affirms: Tripitaka, Mahayana sutras	Denies: Vedas	Affirms: Jain Agamas; Denies: Vedas	Affirm: Vedas, Upanishads and Bhagavad-Gita, (Note: Freschi 2012: The Vedas are not deontic authorities and may be disobeyed, but still recognized as an epistemic authority by a Hindu. Such a differentiation between epistemic and deontic authority is true for all Indian religions.)	Affirm: Vedas, Upanishads and Yoga: Bhagavad-Gita, (Note: Freschi 2012: The Vedas are not deontic authorities and may be disobeyed, but still recognized as an epistemic authority by a Hindu. Such a differentiation between epistemic and deontic authority is true for all Indian religions.)	Affirm: Vedas, (Note: Freschi 2012: The Vedas are not deontic authorities and may be disobeyed, but still recognized as an epistemic authority by a Hindu. Such a differentiation between epistemic and deontic authority is true for all Indian religions.)	Affirm: Vedas, (Note: Freschi 2012: The Vedas are not deontic authorities and may be disobeyed, but still recognized as an epistemic authority by a Hindu. Such a differentiation between epistemic and deontic authority is true for all Indian religions.)
Salvation (Soteriology)	Samsdrasuddhi	Nirvana	Buddhahood	Denies	Siddha, Nirvana	Advaita: Jivanmukti; Dvaita, theistic: Videhamukti	Jivanmukti	Moksha	Heaven
Metaphysics (Ultimate Reality)		The Buddha of the early texts does not focus on metaphysical questions but on ethical and spiritual training and in some cases, he dismisses certain metaphysical questions as unhelpful and indeterminate Avyakta, which he recommends should be set aside. The development of systematic metaphysics arose after the Buddha's death with the rise of the Abhidharma traditions.	Anti-foundationalism (Madhyamaka), Idealism (Yogacara)	Material elements	Anekāntavāda	Advaita: Brahman Dvaita: God and various Jivatmans	Samkhya: Purusha and Prakriti, Yoga: Purusha, Ishvara, Prakriti	Atman, Buddhi, Chitta, Material World (atoms, especially in Vaisheshika)	Atman and material world

== Political philosophy ==
The Arthashastra, attributed to the Mauryan minister Chanakya, is one of the early Indian texts devoted to political philosophy. It is dated to 4th century BCE and discusses ideas of statecraft and economic policy. The Kural text, attributed to Valluvar and dated to around 5th century CE, deals with ahimsa and morality, extending them to political philosophy and love.

Shah Waliullah Dehlawi's Magnum Opus, the Hujjat Allah al-Baligha, considers political society to be a macrosm of the individual. Consequently, it distills a framework for social governance from the principles of self-governance.

The political philosophy most closely associated with modern India is the one of ahimsa (non-violence) and Satyagraha, popularised by Mahatma Gandhi during the Indian struggle for independence. In turn it influenced the later independence and Civil Rights movements, especially those led by Martin Luther King Jr. and Nelson Mandela. Prabhat Ranjan Sarkar's Progressive Utilization Theory is also a major socio-economic and political philosophy.

Integral humanism was a set of concepts drafted by Upadhyaya as political program and adopted in 1965 as the official doctrine of the Jan Sangh.

Upadhyaya considered that it was of utmost importance for India to develop an indigenous economic model with a human being at center stage. This approach made this concept different from Socialism and Capitalism. Integral Humanism was adopted as Jan Sangh's political doctrine and its new openness to other opposition forces made it possible for the Hindu nationalist movement to have an alliance in the early 1970s with the prominent Gandhian Sarvodaya movement going on under the leadership of J. P. Narayan. This was considered to be the first major public breakthrough for the Hindu nationalist movement.

== Influence ==
In appreciation of subtlety and truth of the Indian philosophy, T. S. Eliot wrote that the great philosophers of India "make most of the great European philosophers look like schoolboys". Arthur Schopenhauer used Indian philosophy to improve upon Kantian thought. In the preface to his book The World As Will And Representation, Schopenhauer writes that one who "has also received and assimilated the sacred primitive Indian wisdom, then he is the best of all prepared to hear what I have to say to him." The 19th-century American philosophical movement Transcendentalism was also influenced by Indian thought.

== See also ==
- List of Indian philosophers
- Affectionism
- Ancient Indian philosophy
- Hindu philosophy
- M. Hiriyanna
- Indian art
- Indian logic
- Indian psychology
- Svayam bhagavan
- Trikaranasuddhi
