= Sikhism in Japan =

Sikhism in Japan 日本のシーク教徒

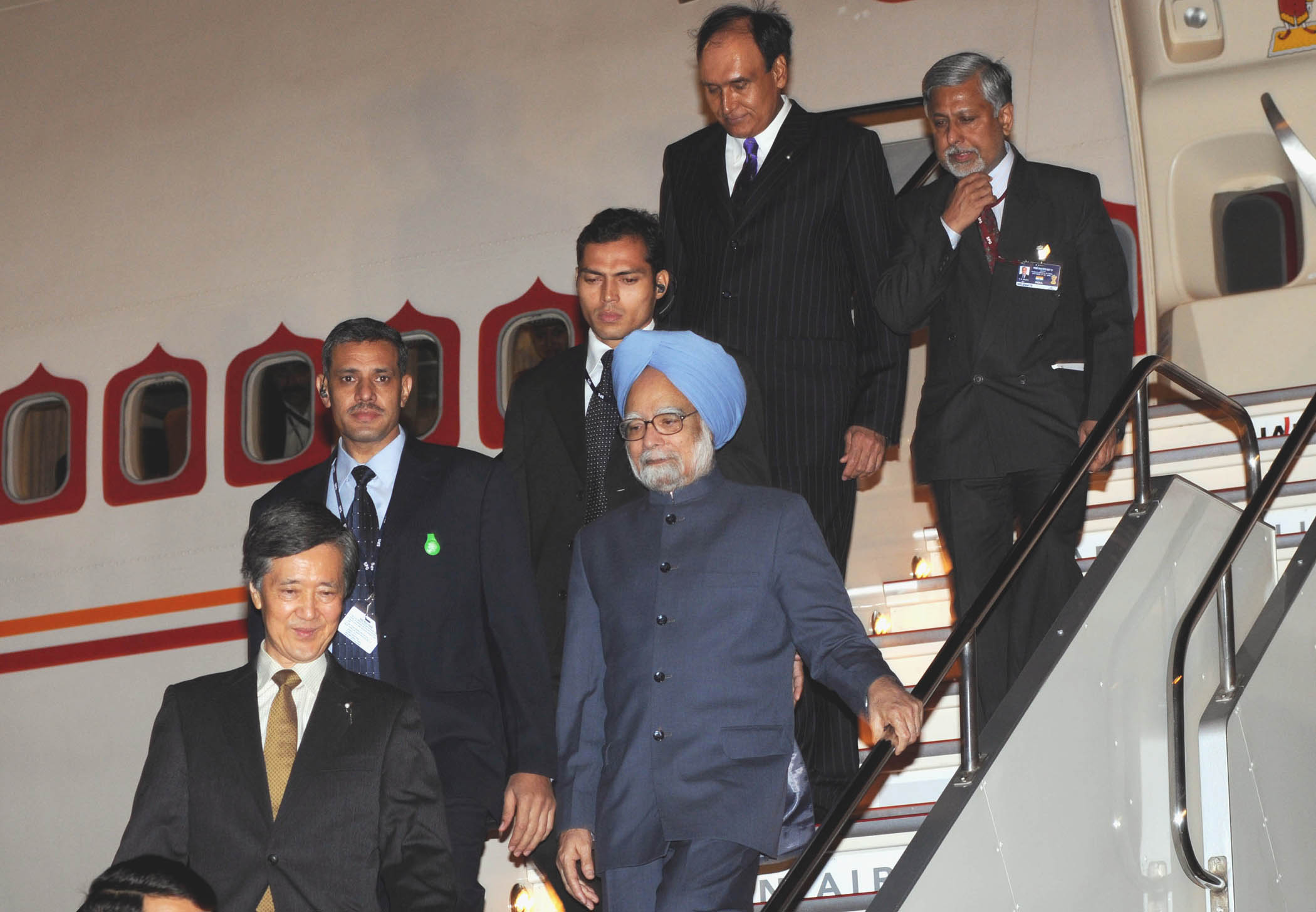
- The First Sikh Prime Minister of India, Dr. Manmohan Singh arrives in Tokyo to attend the Indo Japan Summit (Circa 2008)

Total population
- 500 estimate

Regions with significant populations
- Tokyo · Kobe · Kyoto

Religions
- Sikhism

Languages
- Punjabi · Japanese

Sikhism in Japan is a small, minority religion (Japanese: 日本のシーク教徒, romanized: Nihon no shīku kyōto, lit. 'Sikhs in Japan'). There are gurdwaras located in Tokyo, Ibaraki and Kobe.

== History ==
=== Pre-war period ===
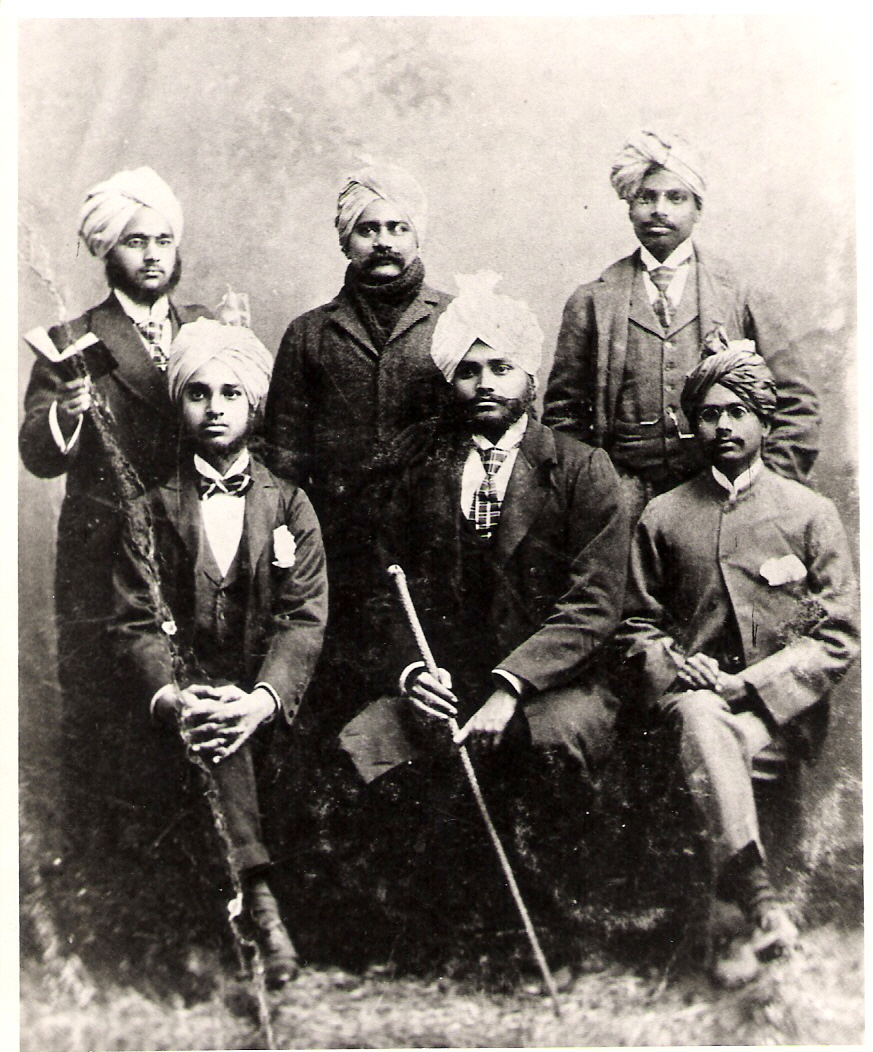
Group photograph of Puran Singh and his comrades in Tokyo, Japan, ca.1900

In 1900, Puran Singh went to Japan for his studies at Tokyo University in the field of pharmaceutical chemistry, where he later became a Buddhist monk.

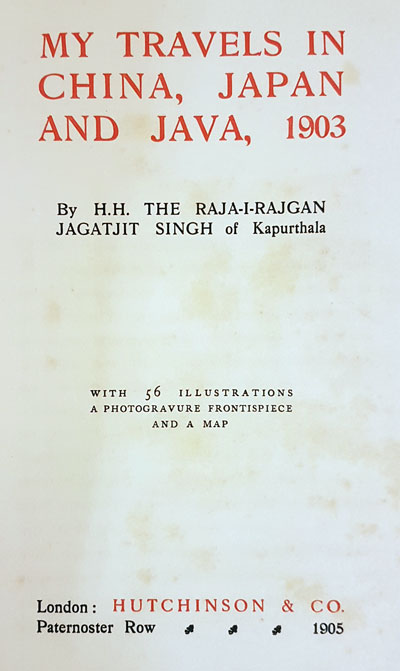
Title-page of My Travels in China, Japan and Java, 1903 (1905) by Maharaja Jagatjit Singh of Kapurthala State

In the spring of 1902, Okakura Kakuzō was travelling in India whilst being accompanied by Surendranath Tagore. Tagore would later recount in his writings the following: "[Okakura's] samurai heart went out at once to the Sikhs of the Golden Temple, and of the kirpan‐cult".

Sikh royal, Jagatjit Singh of Kapurthala, visited Japan between 1903 and 1904, which left a deeply positive impression on him, leading him to write a memoir titled My Travel in China, Japan and Java in 1905.

“From the standpoint of the traveller, Japan is perhaps one of the most interesting countries in the world; the country itself is full of delightful and varied scenery, while its people possess a charm of appearance and manner unlike anything of the kind to be met with elsewhere.”

— Maharaja Jagatjit Singh of Kapurthala, My Travel in China, Japan and Java (1905)

In July 1910, a pamphlet titled Japan-ki-Taraqqi ("Progress of Japan"), by Kesar Singh of Multan and published by the Mufid-i-Am Press, became known and it praised Japan's modernization and achievements, aspiring Indians to strive for the same for their nation. The author urges Sikhs to follow the influence of Japan in development, war and honour.

Sikhs were present in Japan in the early 1920s and first began moving to the western region of Japan after the Great Kanto earthquake of 1923. The Sikhs who lived in Yokohama at the time had their property destroyed in the earthquake and moved to Kobe to start a new beginning. The population of Sikhs in the country was small at this time.

There were some connections between the Japanese and Sikh pahelwan, with one Sikh wrestler named Ranjit Singh (pseudonym Bhu Pinder) recounting a visit to Japan in the mid-1930's, where he had two jiu-jitsu matches with Kimon Killa Kudo (one loss to him and one draw) in Tokyo.

=== World War II ===
Sikh soldiers encountered and fought against Imperial Japanese forces during the Second World War, with some of the Sikh soldiers being taken as POWs and executed by the Japanese, often carried out as a "target practice" exercise. Many Sikhs served in the Azad Hind army, working with the Japanese Empire to oust the British colonists from India. Giani Pritam Singh and Amar Singh, two Sikhs, worked with Iwaichi Fujiwara to set-up the anti-colonial Indian Nationalist Army (Azad Hind).

Japanese soldiers shooting Sikh prisoners who are sitting blindfolded in a rough semi-circle about 20 yards away.

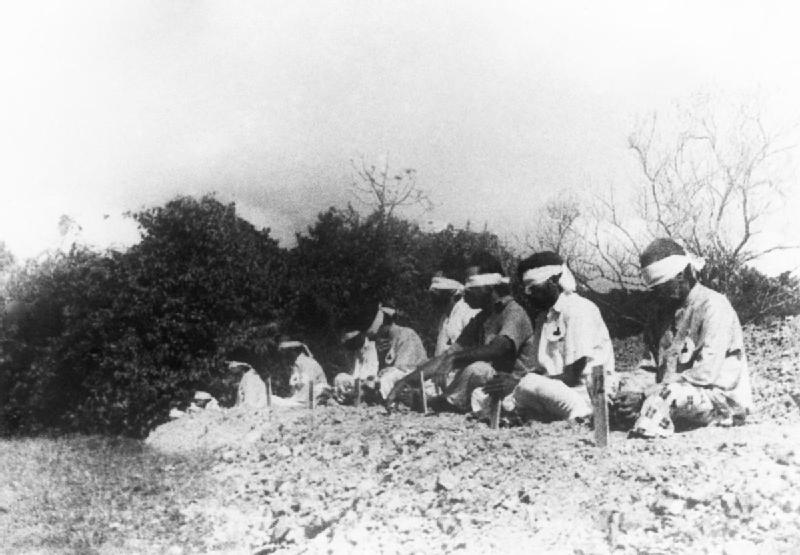

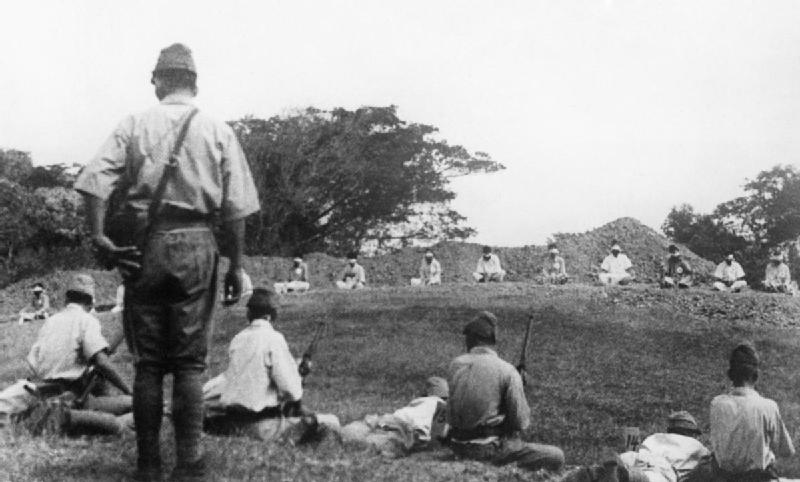

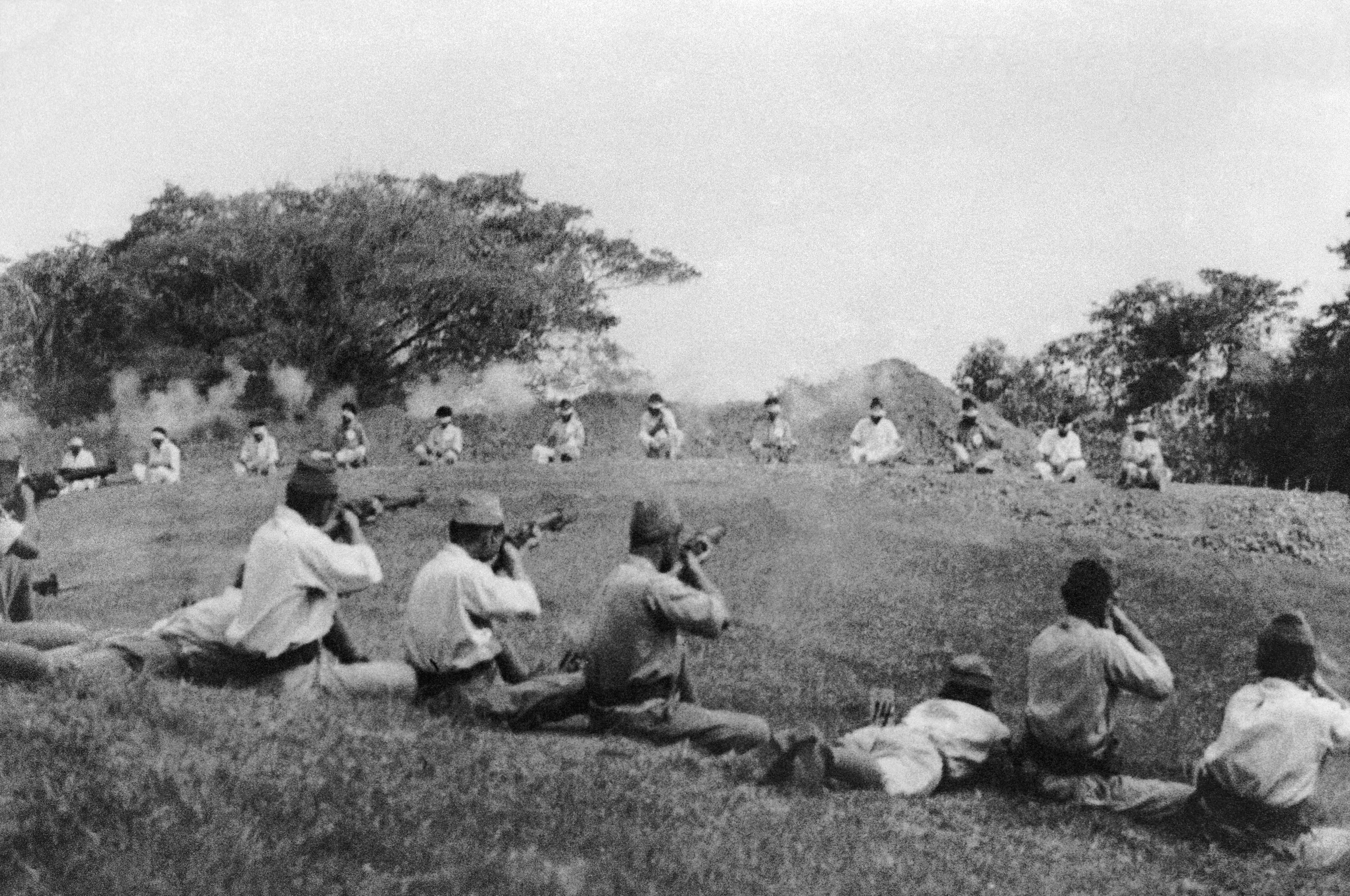

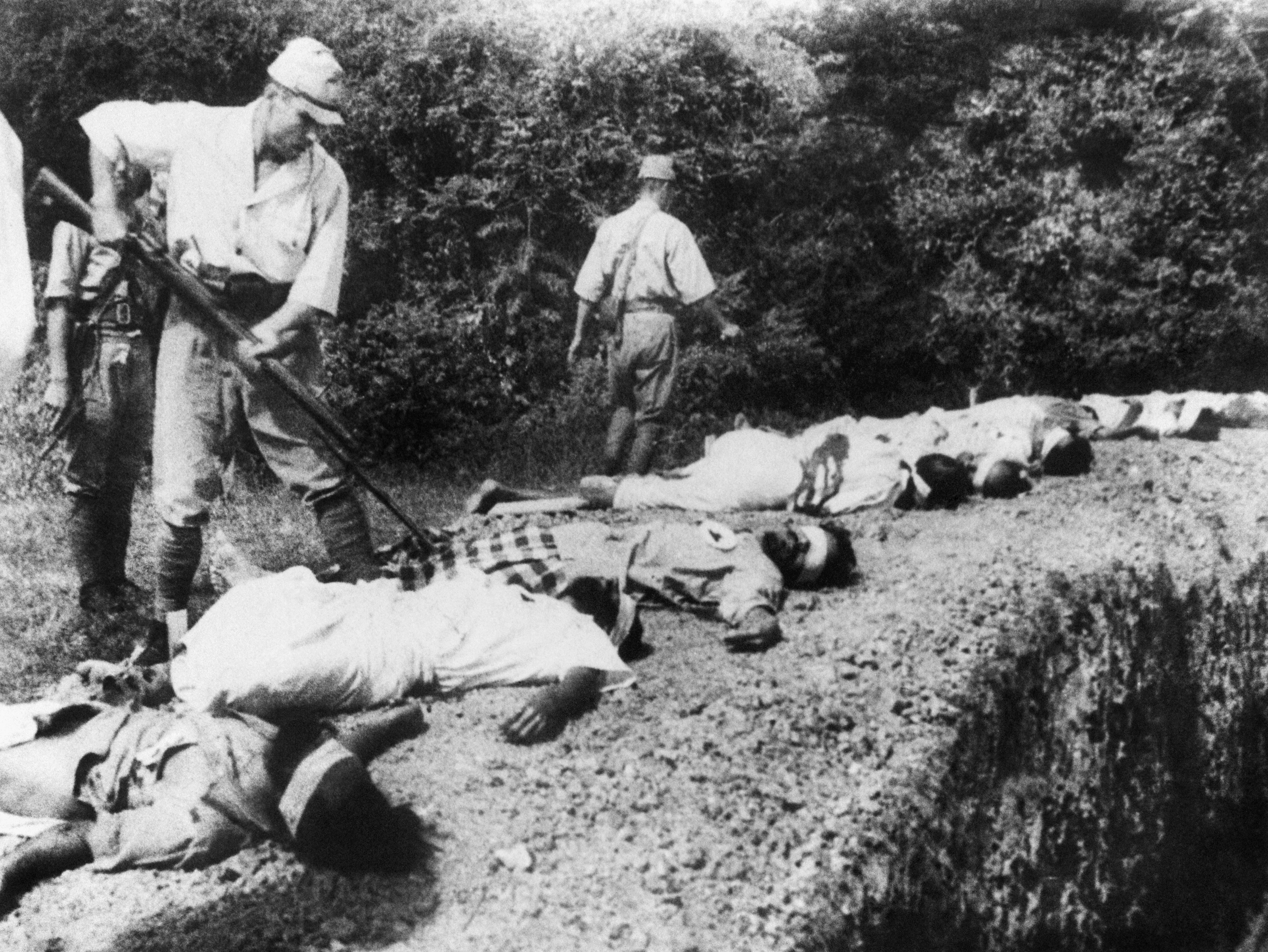

=== Post-war period ===
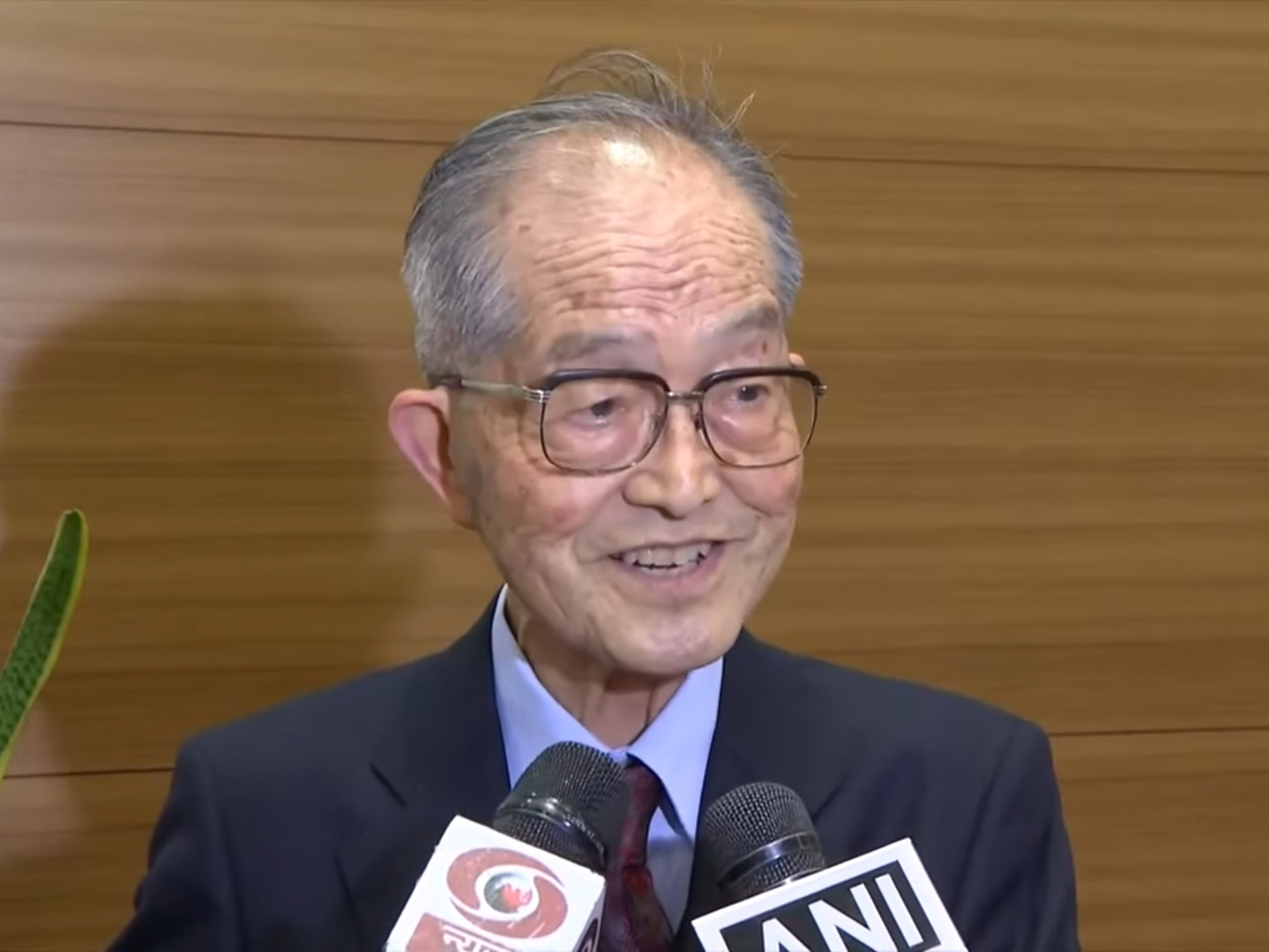
Photograph of Tomio Mizokami, a Japanese professor who was the first to translate the Sikh prayer, Japji Sahib, into the Japanese-language

A gurdwara was established in Kobe in the year 1952. Sikhs students have been in Japan since at-least the late 1960s, when some students from Punjab (India) traveled to the country to study abroad. Sarbjit Singh Chadha, the first non-Japanese enka singer, was among these students. Many Sikh asylum seekers (some of which have birthed children on Japanese soil) have been refused residency in the country and are threatened with deportation. It has been observed that Sikhs in Japan who work low-skilled, blue-collar jobs at small or medium-sized enterprises tend to be mona Sikhs (shorn hair) whilst Sikhs working in the IT industry tend to be keshdharis (uncut hair with turban). This is explained as smaller companies not understanding or being aware of the Sikh custom of letting hair grow naturally whilst IT companies give its Sikh employees more freedom in this regard. Many Sikhs in the country cut their hair short in-order to integrate more easily in the Japanese way-of-life. Some Sikhs have experienced racism at-first from their native Japanese neighbours, being mistaken as "terrorists" due to their unique appearance from the rest of the society, with the police keeping surveillance on them. However, with time the locals came to accept the Sikhs and even began to take part in their religious activities, volunteering at the temple, and donating to Sikh causes, such as food for langar. Many of the local Japanese who are associated with the religion are friends, colleagues, researchers, or spouses of ethnic Punjabi Sikhs. Many ethnic Japanese wives of Sikhs have become believers and practitioners of the religion themselves. In 1985, a Sikh bombed a Narita airport, killing two baggage handlers. According to Azuma Masako, there were between 20,000 and 30,000 Sikhs in Tokyo during the late 1990s. However, most of these Sikhs left the country and only around 500 of them remain, with 50 of those remainders being married to ethnic Japanese spouses. The Sikh community in Kobe is more established and older whilst newer Sikh migrants mostly choose to settle in Tokyo. Kobe Sikhs tend to hold on more to their Sikh identity and appearance, whilst Tokyoite Sikhs tend to shed their outward Sikh appearance to assimilate. Many Tokyoite Sikhs are illegal aliens who have overextended on a tourist visa and remain in the country until they either marry a local person or get deported. There are around 40–50 Sikh families living in Kobe. Many Sikhs reject applying for naturalization in the country as they do not want to discard their Sikh names in the process. Sikhs report experiencing little to no issues with donning a dastar and kirpan, including Sikh children attending Japanese schools who adhere to uniform rules. Amongst Sikh families who have lived in the country for generations, knowledge of the Punjabi language and Gurmukhi script is fading from memory.

Tomio Mizokami is a renowned Japanese academic who has studied the Punjabi-language and Sikh religion for decades, publishing many works and teaching courses on these subjects at universities. He was born in Kobe, which has a large Punjabi and Sikh community, and became interested in the culture due to his early-life experiences interacting with the community. In 2018, he was awarded the Padma Shri for his efforts in promoting Punjabi and Sikh culture. He undertook the effort to translate Guru Nanak's Japji Sahib composition into the Japanese-language. He has also translated books about the Sikh religion into Japanese.

In 2019, Sikh environmental organization, EcoSikh, adopted Japanese botanist Akira Miyawaki's tree plantation method to be used in its mission to plant mini-forests it calls 'Guru Nanak Sacred Forests'.

In 2021, the Guru Nanak Darbar Tokyo gurdwara amassed a collection of 5.2 million yen from local Indian residents and ethnic Japanese donators for the purpose of purchasing supplies as a donation to assist with the 2021 coronavirus crisis that was effecting India at the time.

== Places of worship ==
- A Sikh gurdwara was built in Tokyo in 1999, on the 300th anniversary of the establishment of the Khalsa Panth. The Tokyo gurdwara is officially named the 'Tokyo Guru Nanak Darbar', serving the local Tokyoite Sikh congregation and those near the city, around 70 devotees in total as of 2016. The Tokyo gurdwara is located in the basement of an office building. It is only operational one day out of the month when religious services are held. There is no committee or director of the Tokyo gurdwara.
- Another gurdwara is located in Kobe and is in a residential area, it is officially known as the 'Guru Nanak Darbar Sahib'. The Kobe gurdwara was established on former private dwellings of Indian migrants that were transformed fully into a gurdwara in 1966.

== List of notable Sikhs from Japan ==
- Sarbjit Singh Chadha – First non-Japanese enka singer
- Bob Singh Dhillon – Canadian businessman born in Japan.
- Jaideep Singh – Kickboxer and mixed martial artist, Indian expatriate working for various Japanese MMA organizations.

== See also ==
- Azad Hind
- Indians in Japan
- Sikhism in South Korea
- Sikhism in China
- Sikhism in Hong Kong
- Indians in Taiwan
- Sikhism in Malaysia
- Sikhism in Indonesia
