= Kavyanjali (disambiguation) =

Kavyanjali may refer to:

- Kavyanjali (poetry collection), a 2016 anthology of English poetry by Indian poet Haldhar Nag
- Kkavyanjali, Indian Hindi-language television series
- Kavyanjali – Sakhi Savali, Indian Marathi-language television series
- Kavyanjali (Kannada TV series), Indian Kannada-language soap opera

== See also ==
- Kavya (disambiguation)
- Anjali (disambiguation)
