= Nadella (surname) =

Nadella is Telugu surname, found primarily among people of the Brahmin community.

== Notable people ==
- Nadella Purushottama Kavi (1863–1938), Indian scholar, playwright, teacher and editor
- Satya Nadella (born 1967), CEO of Microsoft
