= Anjala (disambiguation) =

Anjala was a town in Southern Finland.

Anjala may also refer to:

== People ==
- Anjala Zaveri (born 1972), Indian actress
- Ari Anjala, Finnish orienteering competitor
- Outi Borgenström-Anjala (born 1956), Finnish orienteering competitor
- Topi Anjala, Finnish orienteering competitor

== Other uses ==
- Anjala conspiracy, a scheme to end the Russo-Swedish War of 1788–1790
- Anjala (film), a 2016 Indian film
- Anjala (Kouvola), a district in Kouvola, Finland
- Anjala (Salo, Finland), a district in Salo, Finland

== See also ==
- Anjali (disambiguation)
