= Uthaya Sankar SB =

Malaysian writer

- Born: 10 June 1972 (age 54); Taiping, Perak, Malaysia
- Occupations: Writer, Publisher, Media Consultant
- Writing career
- Pen name: Hanuman O, Shafie Uzein Gharib, Leonard Loar
- Language: Bahasa Malaysia, English
- Years active: 1991-present
- Notable work: Siru Kambam
- Notable awards: Hadiah Sastera Perdana Malaysia (1996/97, 1998/99)

Uthaya Sankar SB (born 10 June 1972 in Taiping, Perak) is a Malaysian writer who writes in Bahasa Malaysia.

== Early life and education ==
Uthaya Sankar SB grew up in Lorong B, Aulong Lama village in Taiping, Perak, where the majority of people along the lane were Indian and there were only two Malay families. (theSun, 16 July 2009) He moved to Klang, Selangor and settled in Shah Alam, Selangor. He studied in Universiti Malaya (1993-1998, 2019-2021) and Universiti Kebangsaan Malaysia (1998-1999). He is a Malaysian Malayali.

== Career ==
Uthaya worked at Radio Televisyen Malaysia (RTM) from 1996 to 2010 as a Bahasa Malaysia news editor, newscaster, newspaper reviewer, and trainer.

Between 1999 and 2007 he had lecturing experiences at International College of Music (ICOM), The One Academy (TOA), Yamaha Academy of Arts and Music, and SEGI College.

Since 2011, Uthaya has been a freelance writer, editor and consultant. He runs Perunding Media, Motivasi dan Penerbitan Uthaya (a consultation company) and is also the founder president of Kavyan. Since July 2020, he is a columnist with Utusan Malaysia newspaper.

In December 2021, he lost at least 2,000 books, many of them rare, as his extensive home library was destroyed in the flash floods that hit his home at Taman Sri Muda.

In November 2024, he directed and produced a documentary titled Kenangan di Lorong B about the place he grew up as a kid.

== Reception ==
Uthaya Sankar SB's criticisms of Tamil literature in Malaysia entitled "What Tamil Writers?" (New Straits Times, 11 February 2004) drew a response from R. Karthigesu.

Dina Zaman calls him "honestly blunt" in an article she wrote in New Straits Times (4 July 2001) while Rachael Philip admits that he is "undeniably talented" in New Straits Times (28 August 2005). Amir Muhammad refers to Uthaya as "one of our brightest literary stars and has won many awards" in The Edge (19 November 2001) and "a local Haruki Murakami" in New Straits Times (28 January 2005). "Uthaya’s particular gifts lie in his narrative skill and playful deconstructions of the story form. He easily ranks among the finest writers in this country because his seriousness of purpose is wedded to an admirable lightness of touch. He has fun with the stories, and the fun is infectious" says Amir Muhammad in New Straits Times (13 February 2002) and "He has been one of our most prolific and consistent creative writers for over a decade" in Malay Mail (23 July 2008).

He is also known as "a writer who does not fail to capture the attention of his audience with his outspokenness and, not to forget, provocative introductions" as mentioned by Cheah Phaik Kin in New Straits Times (2 December 1998).

Uthaya was arrested by the Malaysian police on 11 April 2022 for allegedly insulting Prophet Muhammad through a Facebook posting where he quoted an authorized Hadith.

== Works ==
His published books (primarily in Bahasa Malaysia) include:

- Orang Dimensi (1994)
- Nari! Nari! (1995, reprinted 2000)
- Siru Kambam (1996, reprinted 1997)
- Munis Dengan Harimau (1996)
- Hanuman: Potret Diri (1996)
- Yang Aneh-aneh (1997)
- Surat Dari Madras (1999)
- Nayagi (1999)
- Sasterawan Pulau Cinta (2001)
- Panchayat (2002)
- Rudra Avatara (2008)
- Kathakali (2009)
- Panchayat: Edisi Khas (2012)
- Kisah dari Siru Kambam (2013)
- Hanuman: Suara Hati (2013)
- Pulau Pendatang (2015)
- Nari! Nari! (2015, reprinted 2023)
- Malaiur Manikam (2015, reprinted 2016)
- Mandala Bicara (2016)
- Ikan Patin dan Beruang Besar (2017)
- Thirukkural dan Megha Duta (2018)
- Ramayana dan Mahabharata (2019)
- Vetalam dan Vikramaditya (2020)
- Bhagavad Gita (2021)
- Kavya Sastra (2021)
- Suvarna Bhumi (2022)
- Khanda Puranam (2022)
- Katha Sarit Sagara (2023)
- The Painted Cat (2023)
- Dewi Pertiwi (2024)
- CERPEN (2024)
- Rani di Kuil Bhagavati (2025)
- Sebelas Amanat Swamiji (2025)
- "Siapa Bunuh Veer Singh?" (2026)
