= Kaaviya Thalaivan =

Kaviya Thalaivan or Kaaviya Thalaivan (English: Epic Ruler) may refer to these Indian Tamil-language films:

- Kaviya Thalaivan (1992 film), starring Vijayakanth and Bhanupriya
- Kaaviya Thalaivan (2014 film), starring Prithviraj Sukumaran and Siddharth
  - Kaaviya Thalaivan (soundtrack), soundtrack of 2014 film

== See also ==
- Kavya (disambiguation)
- Kaviya Thalaivi, a 1970 Indian Tamil-language film by K. Balachander
