= Anjo =

Anjo is a given name. As a Portuguese name, it means angel. Notable people with the name include:

- Anjo Buckman (born 1989), German rugby union player
- Anjo Caram (born 1991), Filipino basketball player
- Anjo Damiles (born 1996), Filipino actor and commercial model
- Anjo Yllana (born 1968), Filipino actor-comedian, television host and politician
- Yoji Anjo (born 1969), Japanese professional wrestler and mixed martial artist
- Anjo Sarnate (born 2000), Filipino singer
