= List of Northern Punjab cricketers =

his is a list of cricketers who have played first-class, List A or Twenty20 cricket for Northern Punjab cricket team. Seasons given are first and last seasons; the player did not necessarily play in all the intervening seasons. Players in bold have played international cricket.

== C ==
- Ramesh Chadha, 1961/62

B

- Bishan Singh Bedi, 1961/62 - 1966/67

== D ==
- Dwarak Das, 1963/64

== K ==
- LK Kandhari, 1966/67

== M ==
- Kenneth Mackessack, 1926/27

== V ==
- Ramesh Verma, 1965/66
