= Anju Castle =

- Hangul: 안주성
- Hanja: 安州城
- RR: Anjuseong
- MR: Anjusŏng

The Anju Castle is a military fortress built during the Goguryeo kingdom, later rebuilt during Joseon era. It is located in Anju City, South Phyongan Province, North Korea. It was built after the capital was moved to Pyongyang, as a northern defense point.

== Details ==
The fortress consists of three parts, all built at different periods; an inner fort, an outer fort and a new fort. The inner fort dates from the Goguryeo period; it has walls along the ridge of the Kadu range on the shore of the Chongchon River. These walls were 7–8 metres high from the level ground and 4–5 metres on the slope of the hills, 6500 metres long. The outer fort was built during Joseon period; it is 3 650 metres long. The new fort is over 550 metres long and was built in the 17th century. The fort was rebuilt several times during the Goryeo and the Joseon periods.

Inside the fort were large ponds full of water. The largest of them is called the Chilsong Pond, "which was studded with seven tiny islets resembling the Great Bear [constellation]."

The fort features north, south, east and west gates, each built on a stone foundation with an archway and a gatehouse. The gates of the Fortress had remained relatively undisturbed until the end of the Joseon; most of the gates and walls were pulled down during the Japanese colonial period. Only the archway of the east gate of the outer fort remains as originally constructed. The fortress suffered damage during the Korean War, but was rebuilt in 1977.
