= Mukesh Chadha (general) =

Indian Army officer

Lieutenant General Mukesh Chadha AVSM SM VSM
- Military career
- Allegiance: India
- Branch: Indian Army
- Rank: Lieutenant General
- Unit: Army Service Corps
- Awards: Ati Vishisht Seva Medal; Sena Medal; Vishisht Seva Medal

Mukesh Chadha is a lieutenant general in the Indian Army, who is serving as the Director General Supplies and Transport. He also serves as Senior Colonel Commandant of the Indian Army Service Corps. He also served as Chief of Staff of the Central Command, one of the major appointments of the army. He is a decorated officer of the army, who has been awarded the Ati Vishisht Seva Medal, Sena Medal, Vishisht Seva Medal.
