= Gnanananda Kavi =

Indian poet (1922–2011)

S. T. Gnanananda Kavi
- Born: 16 July 1922; Hyderabad, Andhra Pradesh, India
- Died: 7 January 2011 (aged 88); Kakinada, Andhra Pradesh, India
- Awards: Padma Shri; Andhra Pradesh Sahitya Akademi Award; Paidi Laxmaiah Award; Andhra Pradesh Samskruthika Samstha Hamsa Award

Suragali Timothy Gnanananda Kavi (16 July 1922 – 6 January 2011) was an Indian poet from the state of Telangana.

== Life and career ==
Kavi was born in July 1922 in Hyderabad, Hyderabad State, Kavi is credited with forty anthologies which include Dharma Graham, Vamshadhara, Aksharabhisekham, Golconda Kavyam, Kristu Prabandham and Naajeevitha Gatha and has received Andhra Pradesh Sahitya Akademi award, Paidi Laxmaiah award and Andhra Pradesh Samskruthika Samstha Hamsa Award. A recipient of honorary doctorates from Andhra University in 1975 and Telugu University in 1999, he was honoured by the Government of India, in 2001, with the fourth highest Indian civilian award of Padma Shri. He died in Kakinada, Andhra Pradesh in January 2011 at the age of 88.
