= Kalleh Kavi =

Kalleh Kavi كله كاوي
- Village
- Location within Iran
- Coordinates: 36°22′08″N 45°34′44″E
- Country: Iran
- Province: West Azerbaijan
- County: Mahabad
- Bakhsh: Khalifan
- Rural District: Kani Bazar

Population (2006)
  - Total: 225
- Time zone: UTC+3:30 (IRST)
  - Summer (DST): UTC+4:30 (IRDT)

Kalleh Kavi (Persian: كله كاوي, also Romanized as Kalleh Kāvī; also known as Kaleh Gāvī and Kalleh Gāvī) is a village in Kani Bazar Rural District, Khalifan District, Mahabad County, West Azerbaijan Province, Iran. At the 2006 census, its population was 225, in 37 families.
