= Giriraja Kavi =

Girirāja Kavi
- Born: Kakarla village, Cumbum taluk in Prakasam district, Andhra Pradesh
- Died: Tiruvarur, TamilNadu.
- Genres: Carnatic music
- Occupation: Composer

Giriraja Kavi was a noted composer of Carnatic music, who lived in the 18th century in the kingdom of Thanjavur. His hometown, Tiruvarur, lies in the present-day state of Tamil Nadu.

Roughly 200 of his padas, ragas, and talas are housed in the Saraswathi Mahal Library in Thanjavur. Giriraja wrote about 150 padas in honour of his patron, Śāhaji, and Śāhaji's lover Rājamōhini. Kavi was one of the first, if not the first, to use northern Hindustani ragas, such as Brindavani, in the south.

== Family ==
Giriraja's brother, Kavigiri, was known as Venkatagiri and was a scholar and musician.

Giriraja Kavi is not related to Giriraja Brahmam/Giriraja Kavi (as oftentimes misinterpreted, even by eminent musicologists), who is saint-composer Tyagaraja's paternal grandfather, though both of them served the Thanjavur royals around the same time.
