= Agasthya Kavi =

Agasthya Kavi composed 74 works of poetry in Sanskrit in the 14th century. He was from Warangal.
