= Emmanuel Kavi =

- Born: March 3, 1970 (age 56); Lomé, Togo
- Other name: Komlan Kavi
- Known for: Painting
- Style: "flouisme", abstract

Emmanuel Kavi or Komlan Kavi (born 3 March 1970, Lomé Togo), is an African contemporary painter. He refers to his style, a fusion of figurative and abstract art, with the term "flouisme."

== Biography ==
Emmanuel Kavi was born on 3 March 1970 in Lomé, Togo. A self-taught painter, Kavi began with drawing and illustration. In 1987, at 17 years old, he won a national drawing contest in Togo. Progressively, his style evolved towards the abstract. In 2001 he began to exhibit, first in West Africa and then in Europe, where his style is sometimes termed "African cubism."

From 2006, his style further evolved into a fusion of abstract and realism. He began to call this "flouisme". At the same time he established his studio in Ouagadougou, which he considered "the crossroads of African art."

Since 2008 he has conducted several trips to France, exhibiting and performing in several cultural venues.

== Work ==
He works without sketches using materials derived from African soil: pigments, henna, sand, straw and gravel. He places the colours one after another and gradually, as he mixes tools (brushes, knives, fingers) and techniques (erasure, collage, water jet ...), his work takes shape. Daily life, human interactions, nature, spirituality and children are his favourite themes. He sometimes includes tribal symbols and signs in his work, especially of the Dogon people of Mali.

Because of their construction, relief and particular methods, Kavi's works have many different aspects, causing new objects to appear, depending on the light and the angle of the viewer. He uses the term "flouisme" to describe this phenomenon of progressive revelation.

== Exhibitions ==
- 2001: Espace Zaka (Burkina Faso)
- 2002: Centre culturel américain (Mali)
- 2003: Espace Gondwana (Burkina Faso)
- 2005: Galerie Villa Sikandra (Burkina Faso)
- 2006: Lausanne (Switzerland)
- 2006: Galerie Huijs Basten Asbeck (Netherlands)
- 2007: Auction sale "Devoir de mémoire" at the galerie Tajan - Paris (France)
- 2009: Exhibition at the Villa Sikandra during the first festival of the plastic arts in Ouagadougou (Burkina Faso)
- 2010: Exhibition at Ménilmuche - Paris (France)
- 2012: Exhibition at Saint-Blimont in Offeu, at the Château des lumières
- 2012: Exhibition at the Salon International des Arts d’Ouagadougou (Burkina Faso)

== See also ==
- Contemporary African Art
