= Sarbjit Singh Chadha =

Indian singer

Chadha チャダ
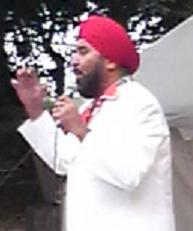

Background information
- Birth name: Sarbjit Singh Chadha
- Born: 17 June 1952 (age 73)
- Origin: New Delhi, India
- Genres: Enka
- Occupation(s): Singer, Businessman
- Years active: 1975–present

Sarbjit Singh Chadha (Japanese: チャダ, romanized: Chada; born 17 June 1952 in New Delhi, India) is an Indian singer, who is the first non-Japanese enka singer. He earned popularity via the Japanese television program Kinyō 10 Ji: Uwasa no Channel.

== Career ==
=== Early beginnings ===
In 1968 aged 15 years old, Chadha was nominated by his father to undertake training for three years in Fukuoka, Japan in orange farming under an OISCA International programme.

Chadha initially learned to speak Japanese by listening to Japanese songs, developing his fluency by singing at parties. Japan's enka genre had a profound impact on Chadha. His friends encouraged him to become a professional singer.

Chadha took guidance in enka from his singing guru, Saburo Kitajima. Chadha has noted that it was the similarity of enka songs such as Kitajima's "Hakodate No Hito" (函館の人) with the songs that he used to sing during his childhood in India that resonated with him the most. Chadha has expressed his love for enka "because [it is] full of feeling...similar to ghazals".

Given the unfamiliarity of the Japanese public with turban-wearing Sikhs, Chadha initially had to perform as a comedian for a year in a national variety programme, Kinyo 10 Ji: Uwasa no Channel. It was through this, broadcast every Friday night at 10pm, that Chadha acquainted himself with the nation.

On his second trip to Japan, Chadha was given an opportunity to record his debut enka song in 1975, the single "Omokage no Hito" (面影の人), selling 180,000 copies.

=== Career in Japan ===
Given difficulties posed by Japan's visa restrictions at the time which required foreigners to return to their home nation and apply for a new visa every six months, Chadha returned to India. However, with the support of his supporters in Japan, Chadha returned to Japan in 1980, starting a business and continuing his passion for singing enka.

After 30 years, Chadha released a greatest-hits album titled "Chadha Densetsu" (チャダ伝説, The Legend of Chadha) under JVC.

=== Career beyond Japan ===
Chadha has performed enka in Delhi, Gurgaon, and Chennai, and is regarded as a cultural bridge between India and Japan. In 2011 to express solidarity with Japan after the Tohoku tsunami, Chadha performed a concert.

Chadha has translated many of the enka songs that he has sung into Hindi.

== Discography ==
- Omokage no On'na (面影の女) – single (25 August,1975)
- Nagashi Komori-uta (流し子守唄) – single (1976)
- Koinyobo (恋女房) – album (29 April, 1976)
- Enka Gokoro (演歌ごころ) – album (20 December, 1976)
- Ishinomaki Burusu (石巻ブルース) – single (1977)
- Chadha Densetsu (チャダ伝説, The Legend of Chadha) – album (17 December, 2008)
- Odoro Maha Chadha (踊るマハチャダ) – compilation (19 November, 2008)

== See also ==
- Sikhism in Japan
- India-Japan relations
