= Kavitha Telikepalli =

Indian computer scientist

Kavitha Telikepalli (born 1974) is an Indian computer scientist known for her research on graph algorithms and combinatorial optimization, particularly concerning matchings, cycle bases, and graph spanners. She is a professor in the School of Technology & Computer Science at the Tata Institute of Fundamental Research.

== Education and career ==
Telikepalli graduated from IIT Madras in 1995, with a bachelor's degree in computer science and engineering. She completed a PhD through the Tata Institute of Fundamental Research in 2002.

After postdoctoral research with Kurt Mehlhorn at the Max Planck Institute for Informatics in Saarbrücken, Germany from 2002 to 2004, she returned to India as an assistant professor at the Indian Institute of Science in Bangalore in 2005. She moved from the Indian Institute of Science to the Tata Institute of Fundamental Research as a reader in 2010, became an associate professor in 2011, and was promoted to full professor in 2021.

== Recognition ==
Telikepalli was named an associate fellow of the Indian Academy of Sciences in 2007. She was one of the winners of the 2008 Indian National Science Academy Medal for Young Scientists.
