= Anjali Gupta =

Indian Air Force officer

- Born: 12 May 1970; Delhi, India
- Died: 11 September 2011 (aged 41); Bhopal, Madhya Pradesh
- Military career
- Allegiance: India
- Service years: 2001–2006
- Rank: Flying Officer
- Units: Aircraft Systems and Testing Establishment, Karnataka
- Military career

Flying Officer Anjali Gupta was an Indian Air Force (IAF) officer who served in Air Force from 2001 to 2006. She was the first female officer in India and in the Air Force to be court martialled. She was working at the Aircraft Systems and Testing Establishment in Bangalore.

== Early life and education ==
Anjali Gupta was born in Delhi to schoolteacher mother, Uma Gupta, and a bank officer father. Anjali was the second of three sisters. Anjali completed her graduation and post-graduation in Psychology and also had an M.Phil. in Psychology from Delhi University. She joined IAF through Short Service Commission (SSC) officer in the Education branch and was first posted at Belgaum, Karnataka in 2001.

== Allegations of harassment ==
In February 2005, Anjali Gupta filed a case against three of her superiors at a police station in Bangalore. The police asked her to resolve the issue with her superiors. Anjali Gupta later approached the Karnataka High Court, demanding an enquiry by the Central Bureau of Investigation. A few days after Anjali Gupta alleged in a TV interview that she was a victim of sexual harassment at the workplace, General Court Martial (GCM) proceedings against her were initiated.

== Trial and dismissal ==
She was placed under house arrest after she made a statement before the Karnataka State Commission for Women that she was "on the verge of taking her life" because of alleged harassment by her superiors. IAF administration had her examined by a panel of psychiatrists comprising doctors from National Institute of Mental Health and Neuro Sciences and Institute of Aerospace Medicine. She was later admitted to Command Hospital. Falsely claiming travel allowance and throwing a breakfast parcel of her senior's were among the fifteen offenses she was initially accused of. In the final chargesheet, the number of charges was reduced to seven.

Anjali Gupta was dismissed from service in 2005 after a five-member General Court Martial (GCM) jury convicted her of misappropriating funds, insubordination and failure to report for duty.

== Death ==
On 11 September 2011, Anjali Gupta was found hanging at a relative's home in Bhopal. Police have detained her former colleague Group Captain Amit Gupta for questioning over her alleged suicide. Anjali Gupta's parents have informed the media that Group Captain Amit Gupta and Anjali were in a relationship and living together.
