= Kobita Club =

Bengali literary group

The Kobita Club
- The Kobita Club logo
- Founded: December 2011
- Founder: Surojit Chatterjee
- Type: Literary Group
- Location: Kolkata, West Bengal, India
- Region served: Worldwide
- Members: 1088+
- Website: www.kobitaclub.com

The Kobita Club is a literary group consisting of poetry lovers, specifically Bengali. The club was founded in early December 2011 by Surojit Chatterjee, music director and lead vocalist of Bangla Band, Surojit O Bondhura & Bhoomi. The Kobita Club was later developed as a website, where poets and poetry lovers all over the world, share creative thoughts and expressions in the form of poetry. The club is registered under the West Bengal Society Registration Act 1961.

== History ==
In December 2011, as a concept of writing poetry, Surojit Chatterjee asked the members of The Kobita Club to write lines following 'Ar bhallagena tomay chhara....' in the 'Surojit O Bondhura Kobita Club' social networking page. With about 460 writings stacking one upon another Surojit Chatterjee decided to make a full-fledged website to archive the poems.

On 28 September 2012, at YMCA Hall, Kolkata, Kobita Club officially launched its website. Bengali author and poet Shri Sunil Gangopadhyay made the inauguration of the website. Apart from poems, the website also contains paintings and photographs.

== Publications ==
=== E-magazines ===
E-magazines contains poems based on particular theme.

- The first e-magazine was the 'Jolrong', which was published on late March 2012. It contained poems based on the theme 'Jol' (water) and 'Rong'(Colors).
- It was followed by 'Bristi Buzz'. 'Bristi Buzz' was published on 5 July 2012; rainy season being the main theme of this magazine.
- 'Dos-e-Dos' was published after one month. The poems in this magazine was limited to 10 lines.
- The 4th e-magazine that was published was 'Robi Chorit' on 5 September 2012. The magazine contained poems on various characters created by Rabindranath Tagore.
- The 5th e-magazine, 'Hese Khun', which was published on 6 October 2012 was made up of humorous poems.

=== Books ===
Kobita club published its first book KobitaClub.Com, on 30 January 2013 in the Kolkata Book Fair under Patra Bharati Publications. The book contained 101 poems of different poets across the world and is described as '101 ti sadharon kobita noy'.

In the year 2014, at Kolkata International Book Fair 2014, Kobita Club launched its second poem collection entitled Kobita Club Dot Com 2'. The book contains 102 new poems of different poets across the world.

Kobita Club with Patrabharati Publishers launched its first short stories collection, Alpo Kathay Gappo on 4 August 2014 in the presence of popular litterateur Sanjib Chattopadhyay and poet Krishna Basu at Niranjan Sadan. Alpo Kathay Goppo includes 60 different short stories written by the members of The Kobita Club from all over the world.

== Recent works ==
Indian recitation band Mahul is working with the Kobita Club from the year 2013 to promote literary awareness.

== See also ==
- Manipuri Sahitya Parishad
- Sahitya Akademi
