= Monima Chadha =

Indian philosopher

- Awards: Annette Baier Prize

Education
- Education: Monash University (PhD), University of Delhi (BA, MA)

Philosophical work
- Era: 21st-century philosophy
- Region: Western philosophy, Indian philosophy
- Institutions: University of Oxford
- Main interests: Buddhist philosophy, philosophy of mind

Monima Chadha is an Indian philosopher and Professor of Indian Philosophy at the University of Oxford. She is also Visiting Karp Fellow at the Sage School of Philosophy, Cornell University. Chadha is known for her works on philosophy of mind and Indian philosophy. She won the Annette Baier Prize for her paper on Buddhist Abhidharma theory of experience.

== Books ==
- Science and Tradition, Indian Institute of Advanced Studies, 2000
- Selfless Minds: A Contemporary Perspective on Vasubandhu’s Metaphysics, Oxford University Press, 2023
