= Anju, Iran =

Anju انجو
- Village
- Location within Iran
- Coordinates: 31°24′24″N 50°41′38″E
- Country: Iran
- Province: Chaharmahal and Bakhtiari
- County: Lordegan
- Bakhsh: Central
- Rural District: Milas

Population (2006)
  - Total: 317
- Time zone: UTC+3:30 (IRST)
  - Summer (DST): UTC+4:30 (IRDT)

Anju (Persian: انجو, also Romanized as Anjū) is a village in Milas Rural District, in the Central District of Lordegan County, Chaharmahal and Bakhtiari Province, Iran. At the 2006 census, its population was 317, in 67 families.
