= Kavyan =

The word Kavyan refers to a group of Malaysian writers of Indian descent who write in Bahasa Malaysia, the national language of Malaysia. Kavyan Writers (or Sasterawan Kavyan) contribute novels, short stories, and poems to the Malaysian literary scene, occasionally in English and Tamil as well. The Kumpulan Sasterawan Kavyan (Kavyan Writers' Group) is an association of Kavyan Writers. The Kavyan set a record in The Malaysia Book of Records for a continuous 96 hours & 32 minutes recital of short stories in August–September 2003. Its founder president is Uthaya Sankar SB.
