= Mahip Chadha =

Indian writer

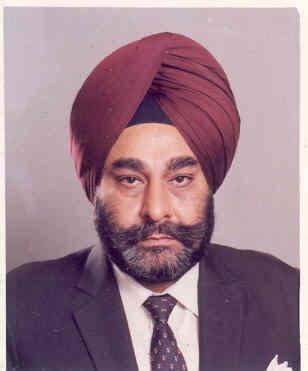
- Education: NDA, IMA
- Occupation: Author
- Spouse: Kiran Chadha (1948–2010)
- Children: Ganiv, Jyotan
- Writing career
- Subject: Military
- Notable works: Soljer Soljer, Grit, Guts, and Gallantry: The Officers and Gentlemen of The Indian Army
- Website: colonelmahipchadha.com

Mahip Chadha was an Indian writer and colonel in the Indian Army. He served in The Second Battalion The Third Gorkha Rifles.

== Early life ==
Chadha was born in a Sikh family. He was commissioned on 25 December 1966 and after serving Indian Army for 34 years retired on 30 June 2000.

== Life after the army ==
After retirement Chadha worked in several jobs. He finally retired as President of Helios Aviation. He resides in New Delhi and started writing as a profession in 2009. He has written four books. He founded the publishing house Creative Crows Publishers in New Delhi in 2014. It is now run by his partner Tannaaz Irani and daughter.

== Death ==
Mahip Chadha died of cardiac arrest in his sleep on 10 January 2017.

== Works ==
Grit, Guts, and Gallantry was the book written by Col Mahip Chadha. It was released on 8 January 2011 By H. E General J J Singh PVSM, AVSM, VSM (Retd.), Governor, Arunachal. The book is an account of the author's journey through the NDA and the IMA. It is a motivational book and serves to act as a much needed career counseling requirement, for students of classes 9 to 12, so that they can consider the Armed Forces of India as a viable career option. It also assists children in the National Cadet Corps to understand the Army better. For enlisted soldiers it assists them to understand what the transformation from soldier to officer means.

Soljer Soljer is the second book published by Mahip Chadha. Soljer Soljer is a story based on an imaginary infantry battalion of the Third Gorkha Rifles – the Sixth battalion.
