= Kavitha, Anand district =

Coordinates: 21°30′N 74°08′E

Kavitha is one of the 65 villages in the Borsad (Vidhan Sabha constituency) in Anand district of Gujarat, a state in Western India.

== History ==
Prior to India's independence, as mentioned by Ambedkar in his writings, Kavitha was one of the villages known for incidents of caste based discrimination against Harijans. In 1935, when the untouchables of the village demanded from the Hindus of the village that their children should be admitted in the common school of the village along with other Hindu children, the Hindus were enraged at this outrage and took their revenge by proclaiming a complete social boycott. Ambedkar notes that the Garasia boys of the village threw Kerosene in the well used by the Dhedh and Chamar people.
