= Kawi =

Kawi may refer to:

- Kawi language, oldest attested phase of the Javanese language
- Kawi script, writing system used across Southeast Asia from the 8th century to around 1500 AD

Kawi (Unicode block), the script in Unicode

- Mount Kawi, a volcano in East Java, Indonesia
- Kawi (horse), a New Zealand thoroughbred racehorse

== See also ==
- Mount Butak, a volcano adjacent to Mount Kawi
- Kavi (disambiguation)
