= Anju Chaudhuri =

- অঞ্জু চৌধুরী
- Born: 1944 (age 81–82)
- Occupation: Indian artist

Anju Chaudhuri (Bengali: অঞ্জু চৌধুরী) (born 1944) is an Indian artist.

In Paris she was taught engraving by Stanley William Hayter.

Chaudhuri's work is in the permanent collection of the Victoria and Albert Museum in London and the National Gallery of Modern Art.
