= Kavi, Gujarat =

Coordinates: 22.197°N 72.637°E

Kavi is a village and railway station located in Jambusar Taluka of Bharuch district of Gujarat, India.

Kavi is also known for its Jain temples and is one of the pilgrimage centers for Jain community.
