= Anju Chadha =

Indian biochemist

- Born: 4 May 1955 (age 71); Ahmednagar, India
- Education: Nowrosjee Wadia College; University of Poona; Indian Institute of Science, Bangalore
- Awards: 1992 Fellow, Alexander von Humboldt Foundation
- Scientific career
- Fields: Chemistry (bio-chemistry)
- Workplaces: Indian Institute of Technology, Madras

Anju Chadha (born 4 May 1955 in Ahmednagar) in is an Indian biochemist. She is a professor at Indian Institute of Technology Madras. She works in the fields of biocatalysis and enzyme mechanisms, enzymes in organic synthesis, asymmetric synthesis using enzymes, chirotechnology, green chemistry and biosensors.

== Early life ==
Chadha was born in Ahmednagar in India.

== Education ==
In high school she was named best student. While getting her bachelor's degree at Nowrosjee Wadia College, she was awarded a Maharashtra State Government Scholarship. She was also awarded a prize in chemistry from the college. She graduated with her degree in chemistry in 1975. She received her Masters of Science in 1977 from the University of Poona with an emphasis in chemistry. In 1984, she completed her PhD from the Indian Institute of Science, Bangalore. She focused on bio-organic chemistry.

== Work ==
Chadha is a lifetime member of the Indian Society of Bio-organic Chemists, the Chemical Research Society of India, and the IISc Alumni Association, Bangalore. She is also an elected member of Madras Science Foundation.

== Recognition ==
- 1975 – Chemistry Prize, Nowrosjee Wadia College, Poona, India
- 1985 – Mrs. Hanumantha Rao Medal, Indian Institute of Science, Bangalore, India
- 1985 – Fellow, Fogarty International Center, National Institutes of Health, Washington, D.C.
- 1992 – Fellow, Alexander von Humboldt Foundation
- 2011 – International Women's Day Award from the University of Madras
