= Nadella Purushottama Kavi =

- Born: Nadella Purushottama Sastry; 23 April 1863; Machilipatnam, Krishna district, British India (now part of Andhra Pradesh, India)
- Died: 27 November 1938 (aged 75); Machilipatnam, Krishna district, British India (now part of Andhra Pradesh, India)
- Occupations: scholar, playwright, teacher, editor
- Spouse: Muktikantamani
- Children: Nadella Medha Dakshinamurthy Sastry
- Parents: Nadella Kameswara Sastry (father); Subbambika (mother)

Nadella Purushottama Kavi (23 April 1863 – 27 November 1938) was an Indian scholar, playwright, teacher and editor. Purushottama Kavi is notable for his "Chitra Kavyas". He was a great scholar in Sanskrit, Telugu, Persian and Hindi and composed more than 100 works in Telugu and Hindi. He also authored several plays in Hindi for the Hindu Nataka Samajam.

== Biography ==
Nadella was born in a Telugu-speaking Brahmin family of Haritasa gotra on 23 April 1863 in Seetharamapuram, his ancestors lived in Nadella village in the Krishna district. His parents were Subbambika and Kameswara Sastry. When his village was destroyed by a flood in 1864, his family migrated to Hyderabad, Andhra Pradesh. He learned Hindi, Persian and Arabic. Having returned from Hyderabad to his native village, Seetharamapuram. After his father died, he completed his secondary education in Hindu High School, Bandar. Later, he worked as a teacher. After writing many plays in Hindustani which were commissioned by the Bandar National Theatrical Society, he died on 27 November 1938.

== Works ==
He started the magazine Budhajana Vidheyani in 1886, he worked as headmaster in Hindu Highschool starting in 1887, after which In 1890 he started a Hindu School and Hindu Bala Samajam. In 1879, he wrote the yakshagana Ahalyasankramdanam. In 1890 he published Harischandra, a play, in his magazine. His works in Telugu include AhalyasankrandanaM (1883), Harischandra (1917), Parijatapaharanam, Sarangadahra, Droupadi vastrapaharanam, Chandrahasa (1916) and Harikatha rahasanam (1922). He wrote 32 plays in the rupaka format between 1884 and 1886 in Hindustani. He staged them in Machilipatnam and other towns in Andhra Pradesh. Kavi occasionally took the part of Sutradhar on the stage.

== Bibliography ==
- "Nadella purushottama kavi", Nataka vijnana sarwaswam, potti sriramulu Telugu viswavidyalayam, Hyderabad, 2008, page no. 407.
- "Andhra Rachayitalu", Madhunapantula satyanarayana sastry, 1950, pages: 208-11
