= Sikhism in South Korea =

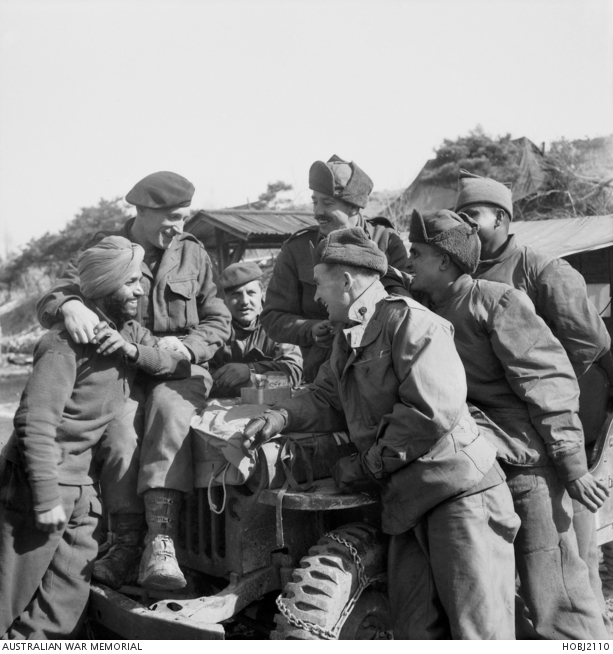
- Sikh volunteer (left) with the 60th Indian Field Ambulance in Korea. Between them are British, New Zealand and Australian soldiers (Circa 1951)

Total population
- ~550

Regions with significant populations
- Seoul · Pocheon · Gwangju · Sungri · Thungnan

Religions
- Sikhism

Languages
- Punjabi · Korean

Sikhism in South Korea is a minority religion.

== History ==
According to records, Sikhs have been in South Korea since the country gained independence from colonial Japanese rule. Early Sikh pioneers came to the country as traders and businessmen exporting textiles in the country to India and the Middle East. However, these early settlers were forced to return home due to strict residency laws at the time. After the first settlement period, Sikh labourers began migrating to the country in the 1980s due to a lack of opportunities in their homeland. Some Sikh families have been in the country for over 50 years. The first South Korean gurdwara was established in 1998 in Sungri on rented property but it burnt down in a fire after one and a half years. Thereafter, the local congregations gathered funds to buy another rental property, where a new gurdwara was officially established in 2004. There are about 550 Sikhs in South Korea, now recently the Sikhs in South were allowed to acquire South Korean citizenship.

Interactions between ethnic Koreans and the new Sikh arrivals remains minimal because according to resident Akash Chodda, the native Koreans are not interested in learning about Sikhs nor their religion or culture. Most of the community consists of men as it is mostly males who are immigrating to Korea. A Sikh is employed as a professor at the University of Seoul. Many Sikhs in the country have overstayed on their tourist visa and remain in the country until they marry locally for residency status or get deported by authorities. Many of the male migrants date and marry local Korean women, who take kindly to their strong work ethic. Religiosity is low amongst the Sikhs in the country and many are sehajdharis who do not observe keeping kesh (uncut hair). Around 30 Sikhs in the country wear a dastar (turban).

The needs of the local Sikh and Punjabi community are represented by the Punjabi Association of Korea (PAOK), which is currently working towards the establishment of a Sikh gurdwara in Seoul to systematically introduce Sikhism to Korea. The Punjabi Association of Korea is currently headed by Lakvinder Singh. The rationale given for the building of a new gurdwara in Seoul is that the current gurdwaras located in Pocheon and Gwangju are too far from the capital city of Seoul and that such an endeavor will improve Indo-Korean economic ties.

== Occupations ==
Most Sikhs in the country are working in the agricultural, trading, corporate, and restaurant sectors.

== Gurdwaras ==
=== Current temples ===
- Gurdwara Shri Singh Sabha, South Korea. It is located at Idonggyo-ri, Sohol-eup, Pocheon-si which is in the Gyeonggi-do province of South Korea. Around 500 members of the community gather to worship at the temple regularly. It is located across the street from the only Hindu temple in the country. Some Hindus also worship at the temple, a sign of heterogeneous and fluid religious practice. It is a two-storied complex at the address of Kyungki-Do, Pocheon-Si, Soheul-Eup-I (2), Dongkyori 202–1. It was officially established on 21 November 2004.
- A gurdwara is located in Gwangju.

=== Former temples ===
- A gurdwara formerly located in Sungri was established in 1998 but it burnt down in a fire one and a half years later.

=== Planned temples ===
- The Punjabi Association of Korea is working towards establishing a Sikh gurdwara in the capital city of Seoul.

== Popular culture ==
In May 2024, British Sikh actor, Taz Singh (born Tarsvinder Singh Sihra), appeared in BTS' music video for the song Lost! starring alongside Kim Nam-joon (known professionally as RM). Taz Singh spoke Korean in the music video.

== See also ==
- Sikhism in Japan
- Sikhism in China
- Sikhism in Hong Kong
- Indians in Korea
