= Gurdwara Shri Singh Sabha Sahib =

Gurdwara in Pocheon, South Korea

Religion
- Affiliation: Sikhism

Location
- Interactive map of Gurdwara Shri Singh Sabha Sahib
- Coordinates: 37.81856°N 127.13036°E

Architecture
- Established: November 21, 2004

Gurdwara Shri Singh Sabha Sahib (Korean: 구르두와라 시리 싱 사바 사헤브) is a gurdwara in Pocheon, Gyeonggi Province, South Korea. It was established on November 21, 2004. As of 2023, it is the only Sikh temple in the country. The building has two floors, and is decorated with images of Sikh religious figures and history. Many members of the small Sikh community in South Korea congregate at the gurdwara each week.

== See also ==
- Sikhism in South Korea
