= Sikhism in China =

Sikhism in China 锡克教在中国

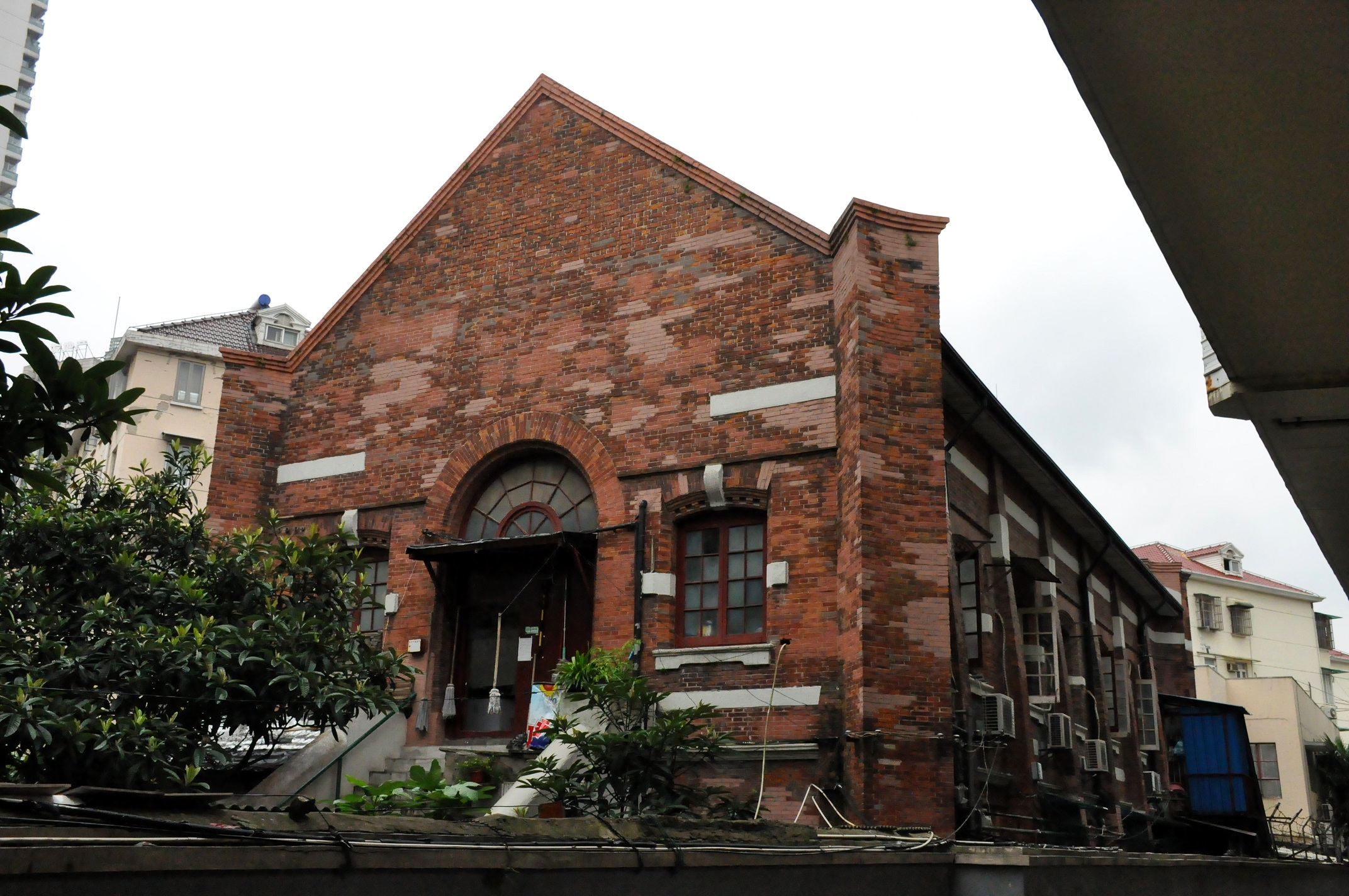
- Yindu Xikejiaotang, Shanghai

Total population
- Unknown

Regions with significant populations
- Shanghai · Hong Kong · Yiwu · Keqiao · Tibet

Religions
- Sikhism

Languages
- Punjabi · Mandarin · Cantonese · Tibetan • Hindi • Urdu

Sikhism in China is a minority religion in the People's Republic of China (Mandarin Chinese: 锡克教在中国, romanized: Xí kè jiào zài zhōngguó, lit. 'Sikhism in China'). Sikhism originated from the Punjab region of the northern Indian subcontinent. While it is purported that Guru Nanak travelled to Tibet and the writings of Guru Gobind Singh reference China, a substantial Sikh population in much of China took hold during the British colonial period. Sikhs came to China for work under the colonial framework or used it as a stepping-stone for further migration to other regions of the world. After the establishment of the People's Republic of China, the Sikh population declined. Today, Sikhs form a small minority in China.

== History ==
=== Sikh gurus ===
==== Guru Nanak ====
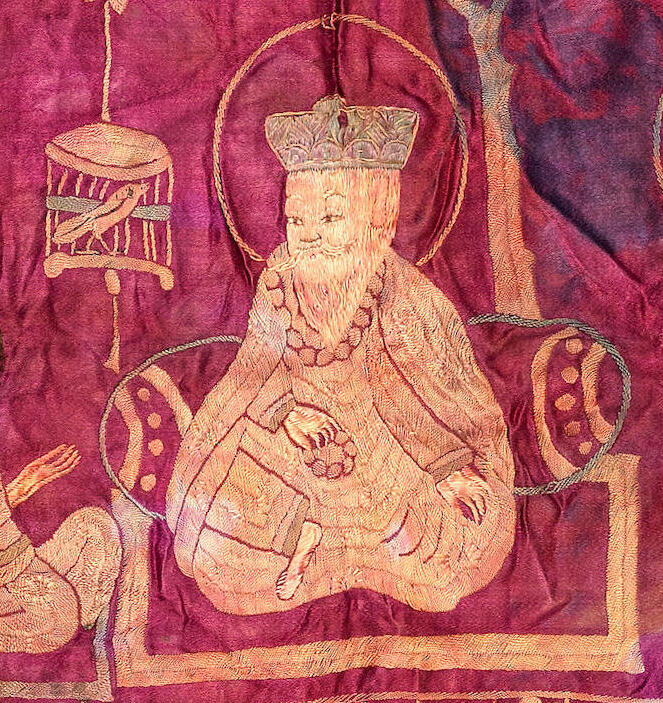
An embroidered silk panel depicting Guru Nanak from China

Guru Nanak is traditionally locally referred to as Baba Foosa in China proper and as Nanak Lama in Tibet. In popular Sikh tradition, particularly the Puratan Janamsakhi, Guru Nanak is believed to have visited Tibet during his distant travels. Nanak's travel itinerary through Tibet would have started by departing from Manikaran, onward to the Tibetan plateau, reaching Lahaul and Spiti (northeast of Kulu). Nanak would have travelled through both the Rohtang Pass and Chandan Kala Pass to reach Spiti. From there, Nanak went through the Sprang (Prang) Pass to reach Tibet through an old trade route between India and Tibet. Nanak would have then passed through both Chomurti and Boling to reach the sacred lake of Mansarovar, and finally Mount Kailash. Nanak would have encountered many members of the Siddha tradition on this route through Tibet. According to Sikh lore, in the area of lake Mansarovar and Mount Kailash, a dialogue is said to have taken place between Siddhas residing at the location and Nanak's retinue. They wanted to know how Nanak had successfully traversed the mountainous landscape and terrain to reach the sacred area, with Nanak replying that it was through faith in the divine. The Siddhas are then said to have posed questions to the guru about the state of affairs in the Indian subcontinent and the status of the commonfolk, to which Guru Nanak responded that India was in turmoil and suffering due to oppressive rulers. Guru Nanak then stated that true spirituality and religion was in decline in India due to hypocrisy, prudishness, bribe-taking, and evil. In response to one of the questions posed by the Siddhas, Guru Nanak is said to have reprimanded them for escaping to this distant site away from the happenings of the subcontinent, leaving the masses behind without a spiritual guide.

==== Guru Gobind Singh ====
Guru Gobind Singh makes mention of China, Tibet, and Manchuria in the Akal Ustat section of the Dasam Granth, stating:

"Gorkhas sing thy praises, the residents of China and Manchuria bow their heads before thee and the Tibetans destroy their own sufferings by remembering thee. Those who meditate on thee obtain perfect glory, and prosper greatly. One cannot know thy limit, O Infinitely Glorious Lord! Thou art the Giver of all, therefore thou are Boundless."

— Guru Gobind Singh, Dasam Granth, Akāl Ustat composition

=== Sikh Confederacy ===
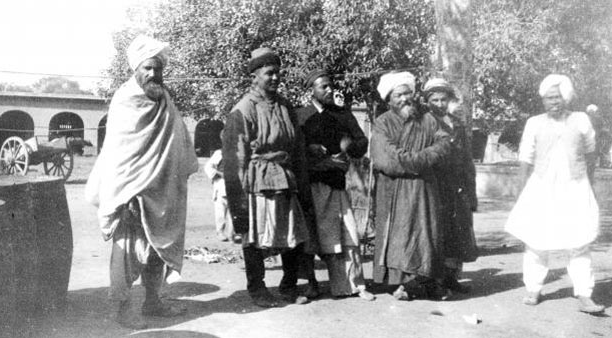
Yarkandi traders from Xinjiang, China in Amritsar, c. 1903

In the 18th century during the reign of the Sikh Misls in Amritsar, increased stability led to the development of an import and export-based economy. Many goods were exported to Yarkand, Turfan, and Chinese Turkestan. The goods exported from Amritsar consisted of shawls, silks and woolen cloth, metalware, and agricultural products. The imported goods were gold, raw silk, horses, and weapons. Caravans took the goods back and forth along the Sikh Road, from Amritsar to Kabul, and then to Bukhara, where they were further distributed.

=== Sikh Empire ===
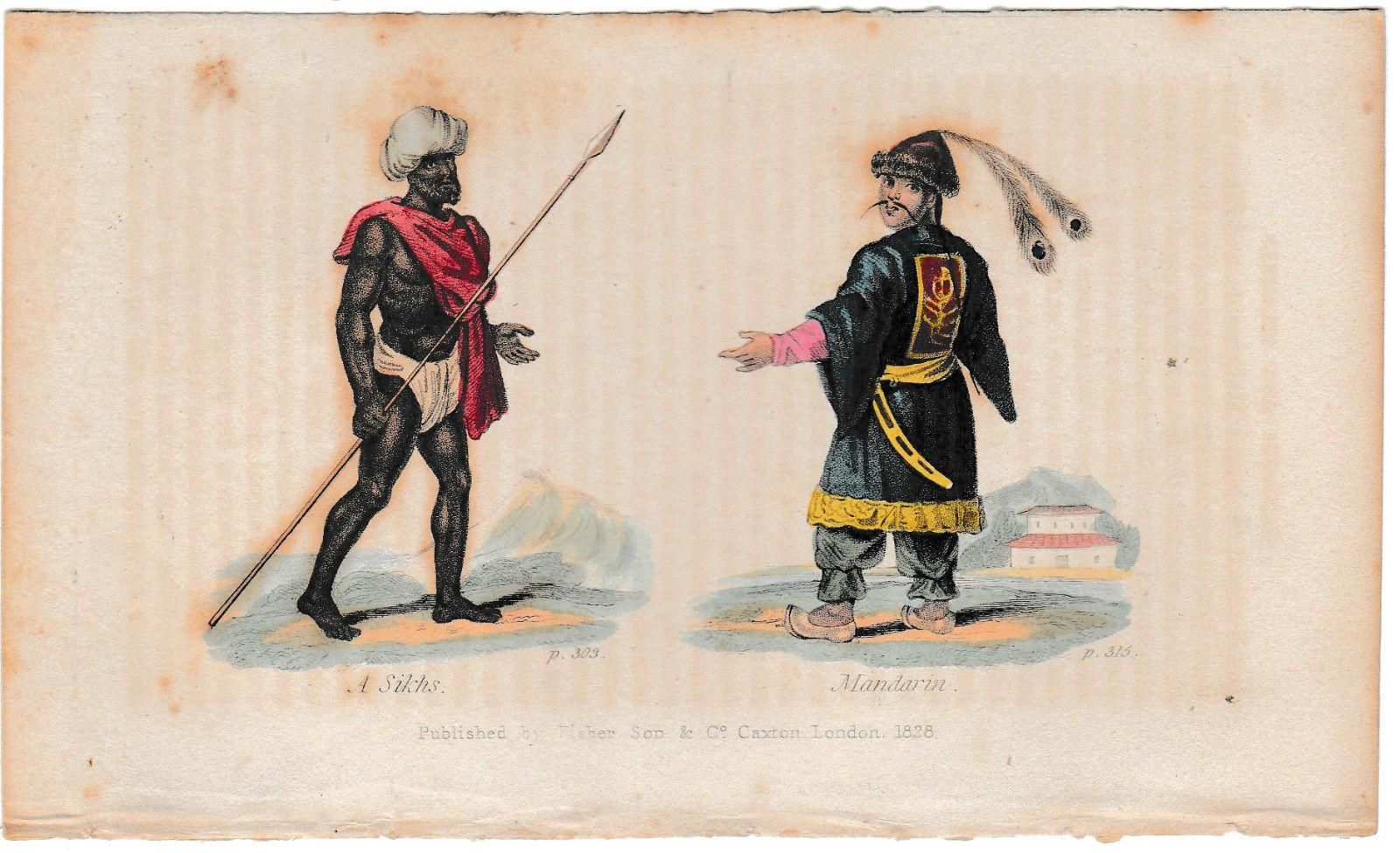
Hand-coloured engraving of a Sikh and Mandarin, published in 'The Modern Voyager and Traveller' (London, 1828)

In March 1831, Victor Jacquemon, a French botanist and geologist, paid a visit to Lahore during the reign of Ranjit Singh and met with the ruler. During a discussion between the Frenchman and the Sikh ruler, the latter inquired about Tibet and wanted to know details about the region. Jacquemon responded that Tibet was a land of "high altitude, cold weather, barren land" and was a "poor country". After hearing this description, Ranjit Singh is said to have replied that "he will not bother to conquer a poor country."

In 1834, after Zorawar Singh's success against Ladakh, Ranjit Singh forbade him from taking further action to avoid any conflicts with the Chinese.

According to Sohan Lal Suri's Umdat-ut-Tawarikh, Zorawar Singh, a Dogra general of the Sikh Empire, expressed interest in expanding into western Tibet for territorial gains during a meeting with Maharaja Ranjit Singh in the village of Jandiala Sher Khan in March 1836. However, Ranjit Singh did not grant permission for the proposed Tibetan military expedition. Ranjit Singh remarked that the Chinese emperor possesses an army consisting of 1.2 million soldiers so a war against them would not favour him.

According to Giani Gian Singh's Raj Khalsa, after the triumph of Zorawar Singh over the Namgyal dynasty of Ladakh, Zorawar Singh was rewarded with a siropa (robe of honour) and other gifts. Zorawar Singh then petitioned Ranjit Singh again for a campaign against the Tibetans for the purpose of annexing it into the Sikh Empire but the idea was again turned down as the time was not "opportune" as per Ranjit Singh. According to Inderjeet Singh, the Sikh monarch may have declined the proposition to invade Tibet because the terrain was difficult and the region was poor in natural resources.

After the Chinese did not respond to the Sikh hostilities against Ladakh, Nau Nihal Singh permitted Zorawar Singh to capture Iskardu of the Maqpon dynasty of Baltistan. Eventually, a later Sikh ruler, Sher Singh, agreed to Zorawar Singh's proposed campaign against Tibet.

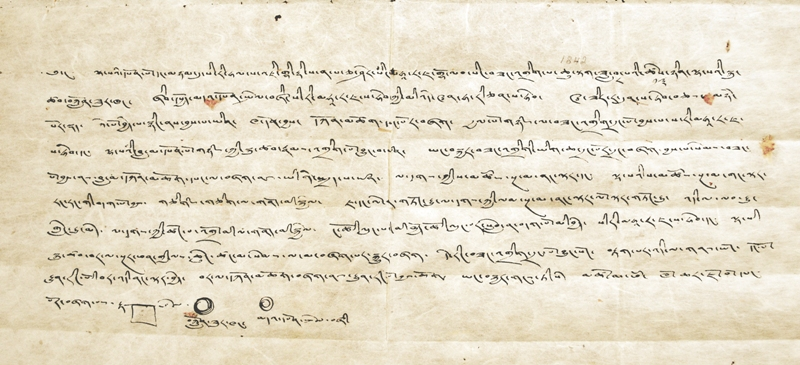
Letter of exchange from the 1842 Treaty of Chushul between the Tibetans (protectorate of the Qing Dynasty) and Dogras (vassals of the Sikh Empire)

Zorawar Singh led an invasion force into Tibet in May 1841. The invasion force consisted of three divisions and reached lake Mansarovar in September of the same year, where an encampment was established. Whilst initially successful against the local Tibetan forces, the Tibetan winter set-in and the invading forces were defeated and routed on 12 December 1841 by the Qing-Tibetan forces, with Zorawar Singh being beheaded. The Qing-Tibetan forces then attempted to invade Ladakh but were repelled. The war ended with the Treaty of Chushul between the Sikh Empire and Qing Dynasty.

The Tibetan word for a Punjabi Sikh is Singpa. When the Tibetans captured prisoners-of-war during the Dogra-Sikh invasion, the POWs were initially taken to central Tibet. Instead of executing the POWs, the Tibetans decided to show mercy and disperse them to localities across Tibet.

In March 1856, a treaty between Tibet and the Kingdom of Nepal, known as the Treaty of Thapathali, was signed. Clause 4 of the treaty freed the remaining Sikh/Dogra prisoners-of-war still held in Tibetan captivity whom were captured in 1841. This clause was included in the treaty at the behest of Gulab Singh of Kashmir to free the remaining prisoners, possibly for political capital. Of the original soldiers whom were taken as prisoners by the Tibetans, 34 could not be located but 106 were successfully assembled in Kathmandu at the British residence. However, only 56 of these mustered 106 original soldiers wished to return to India and the rest opted to remain in Tibet, as many had since settled in southern Tibet since the war, had married local women and thus now had a family, and were running businesses. The 56 former POWs who opted to return were each awarded with silver medals bearing a bust of Maharaja Surendra Bikram Shah of Nepal and a robe of honour.

According to Tsepon W. D. Shakabpa, more than 200 of these POWs preferred to remain in Tibet rather than be repatriated back to their homeland. These Dogra-Sikh POWs settled in Lhasa, Yarlung, Chongye, and other parts of southern Tibet. Eventually, the former POWs married local Tibetan women, adopted Tibetan customs, and took up professions as butchers, fruit-tree cultivators, amid other jobs. The former POWs introduced the cultivation of apricots, apples, grapes, and peaches to Tibet. Since they were outsiders, they were stigmatized by the local Tibetans and thus formed relations with other marginalized groups within Tibetan society, such as Muslims, which led to former POWs slowly adopting Islam themselves. The former POWs came to be known as Singpa Khache by the local Tibetans, which blends the Tibetan word for a Sikh and Muslim together. The Singpa Khache came to become an important group within Lhasa's Muslim community and they had the honour of serving meat dishes to the Dalai Lama. However, David G. Atwill argues that the Singpa Khache descend instead from Muslim soldiers that were in Zorawar Singh's invading army. Of the nearly 200 Barkor Khache families that resided in Lhasa in the early 1950s, approximately 20% were of Singpa Khache background. Many descendants reside in the Lhokha region.

=== Colonial period ===
In the colonial-era, Sikhs in China were most prominent in Hong Kong, with Shanghai following next.

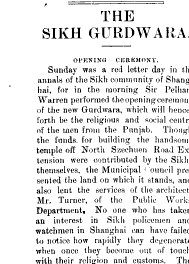
'North China Herald' newspaper snippet about the opening ceremony of Gurdwara Shanghai on Tung Pao-hsing Road in Shanghai, China, 1908

Maharaja Jagatjit Singh of Kapurthala State visited China, Japan and Java (Indonesia) between 18 October 1903 to 1 February 1904, afterwards publishing a memoir recounting his journey through these lands. In his memoir, he recounts about his experience in Shanghai and surrounding parts of China, including him making a donation to the local Sikh cause for constructing a Sikh temple in Tientsin. Jagajit Singh would return to Shanghai many times over the years, with local Sikhs hosting him for dinner at a local hotel.

Sikhs in China had been observing the Chinese migrating to Canada, seeing as it was an attractive destination for settlement, and emulated the Chinese by attempting to migrate to Canada themselves whilst alerting their friends and family back home in India on the prospect. Many Sikhs who were aboard the ill-fated Komagata Maru en route to Canada hailed from Shanghai.

According to Cao Yin, Shanghai played a pivotal role in the establishment of a Sikh diaspora throughout the world as Shanghai was often the first-stop in the global migration of Sikhs throughout the globe.

Accounts of the Sikh population in Shanghai at various times are spurious and contradicting. One source claims a population of "a few thousand" Sikhs in Shanghai by 1890. According to another source, by 1907, there were 850 Sikhs in Shanghai.

Prior to 1908, the gurdwara located on Boone Road (now Tonggu Road) in Shanghai served the needs of the Sikh community. However, during a Guru Nanak Gurpurab celebration in 1907, the local Sikhs decided to become affiliated with the Chief Khalsa Diwan based in Amritsar but the Boone Road gurdwara was too small to suit their needs and the growing Sikh population. Thus, it was decided that a new temple premises needed to be constructed. A committee, led by Jalmeja Singh, and Gurdwara Building Fund was established for the effort of constructing a new, larger Sikh temple funded by donations from local Sikhs. The local Shanghai Sikhs had been desiring a larger gurdwara for several years and had been making requests to the community for donations and the Shanghai Municipal Council for land for the temple.

The Dong Baoxing Road Gurdwara's foundation stone was laid on 11 August 1907 on a Sunday. The Old Sikh Gurdwara at 326 Dong Baoxing Road was opened in 1908. The Gordon Road Gurdwara was opened on 21 July 1916 on a Friday. Both the newer Gordon Road and older Dong Baoxing Road gurdwaras were under the same management committee, however the latter came to be visited by watchmen and visitors whilst the former was used by Sikh policemen of the Shanghai police. The purpose of the British constructing the Gordon Road Gurdwara was to isolate Sikh policemen from Ghadarite elements at the Dong Baoxing Road Gurdwara by giving them a separate place of worship which was under the supervision of the Shanghai Municipal Council and restricted to policemen. Furthermore, the construction of the Gordon Road Gurdwara was a gesture of gratitude for the participation of Sikhs in World War I.

Rabindranath Tagore visited Dong Baoxing Road Gurdwara during his 1924 visit.

The Sikh community in Shanghai was divided along regional lines from back in Punjab: the Majhais and the Malwais. There were also noticeable differences in viewpoints between the older and younger generations of Sikhs in Shanghai, specifically with regards to loyalty to the British and revolutionist tendencies. The Sikhs were not the only members of the Indian community in the city, there were also Parsis, Bohra Muslims, and Sindhis whom had established communities in the city during the colonial-period – however the Sikhs formed the largest component of the Indian population of Shanghai at the time.

A major brawl took place in August 1926 at the Dong Baoxing Road Gurdwara, when the gurdwara's new working committee secretary could not be inducted. In the brawl, Manjha and Malwa Sikhs faced-off against each other using hatchets, pistols, battle-axe, and sticks. When Shanghai Municipal Police Detective Sergeant J. Knight arrived at the gurdwara due to the fight, he found both sides 10 yards from one another. Each side claimed the first side to back down and leave were "losers". The incident led to the injuries of five Sikhs, including one who was hospitalized for a skull fracture. Due to this event, the gurdwara was temporarily closed and a guard was put-in-place.

Schools and hockey associations were founded by Shanghai's Sikhs. Eventually, there came to be a young generation of Shanghai Sikhs who were born or raised in Shanghai. In 1922, the Thomas Hanbury School for Boys opened a special class in a separate building to cater to twelve of these young Sikh boys. However, the class was shortly shut-down as educating the Sikhs meant empowering them, which could lead to a development of a national consciousness. Religious and informal means of education for Sikhs in Shanghai was carried-out by the official gurdwaras but also unofficial ones.

According to Khushwant Singh, some of the Sikh men residing in Shanghai in this era fetishized White women, especially blondes. The Sikh men were attracted to the gori chamri (white skin) of the White women. Ralph Shaw, a British journalist who lived in Shanghai between 1937 and 1949, narrates a story in his book Sin City about an incident where a Sikh man in Shanghai is alleged to have groped the buttocks of a British woman who was watching a race. The Sikh man alleged to have groped the woman defended himself by explaining that the woman felt a bottle of beer in his pants' pocket and that it must have happened when he tried to take it out in order to drink some of it. A judge did not believe this explanation and gave the Sikh man a heavy fine for the groping.

In 1932, Indian hockey player Dhyan Chand visited the Dong Baoxing Road Gurdwara at a time when Chinese and Japanese forces were engaged in conflict in the city. In Chand's autobiography, Goal!, he records that the Sikh temple was heavily damaged in the fighting and that Japanese soldiers looked at him suspiciously when he left the gurdwara.

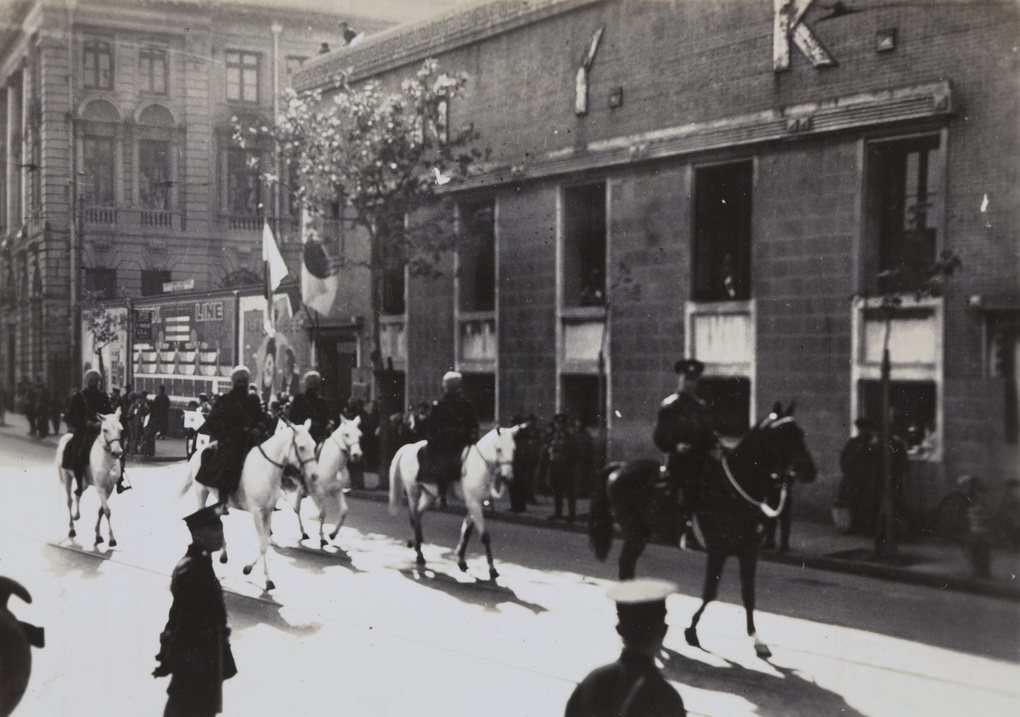
Mounted Shanghai Municipal Police (including Sikhs) taking part in Japanese victory parade through the International Settlement, Shanghai, 3 December 1937

Many Sikh policemen in Shanghai started returning to India in the late 1930s after the Japanese success in the Battle of Shanghai. Between the late 1930s and early 1940s, the International Settlement came to be increasingly threatened by the Japanese advance, thus the majority of Sikhs in Shanghai emigrated away taking their families with them, mostly returning to the Punjab.

During the 1930s and 1940s, some Jewish refugees fleeing the Nazis took shelter in China. Holocaust survivor, Susanne Goldfarb, recounted a story of an Indian man being married to a Jewish lady from an Orthodox family background. The marriage took place within a Sikh gurdwara in Shanghai. The parents of the Jewish lady sat in shiva (seven-day mourning) to protest their daughter being married to a non-Jew. This interracial couple later settled in Hong Kong.

When Netaji Subhas Chandra Bose visited China, he was a guest-of-honour at the Dong Baoxing Road Gurdwara. Sikhs who were part of the Indian National Army in Shanghai worked in the area of and even inside the Dong Baoxing Road Gurdwara to mobilize volunteers and funds.

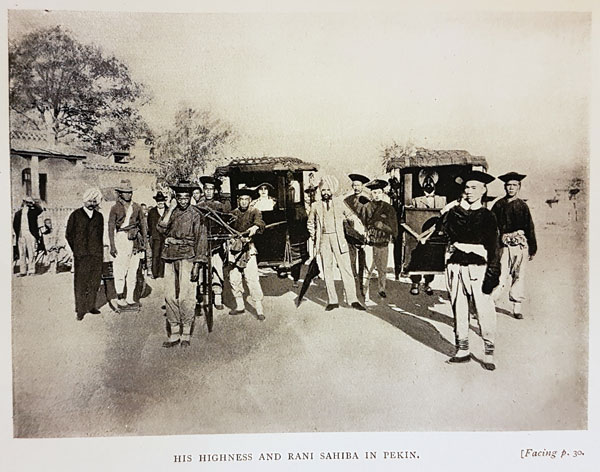
Photograph of Maharaja Jagatjit Singh of Kapurthala State and his wife visiting Beijing, China in 1903

Rabinder Nath Tagore with Sikhs in Shanghai, 1924

==== Sikh professions in colonial China ====
===== Traders and explorers in Western China =====
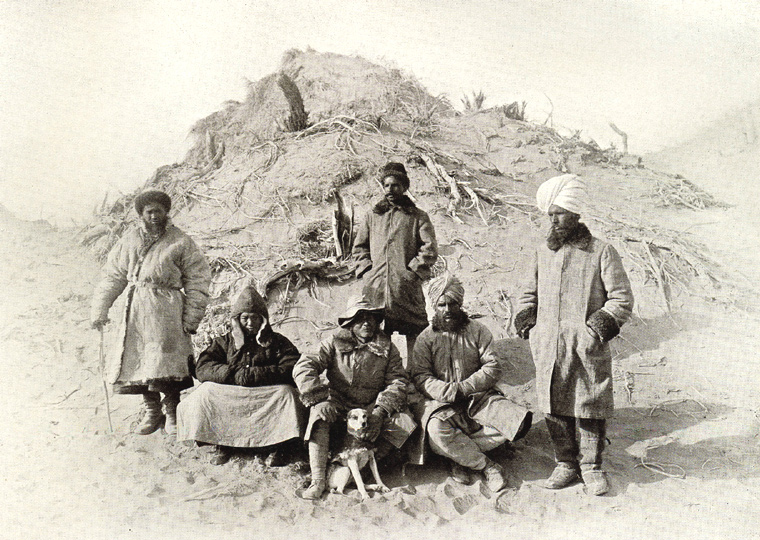
Photograph of Aurel Stein with his expedition team, including R.B. Lal Singh, in the Tarim Basin, c. 1910.

Punjabi Khatri Sikh and Hindu traders worked along the Silk Road, from Ladakh to Central Asia (including Chinese areas). At one point, the Khatri trade network consisted of around 200 gaddis in the Chinese part of Central Asia. Punjabi Khatris played an important role in the trade between Leh and Yarkund in Xinjiang.

Robert Shaw recounts in Visits to High Tartary, Yarkand, and Kashgar that a Sikh merchant by the name of Tara Singh accompanied him to Yarkund in modern-day Xinjiang in 1867.

Rai Bahadur Lal Singh (1860–1930), a Sikh cartographer, was a companion of Aurel Stein, who journeyed with him across the Silk Road. Lal Singh was with Stein when the latter is credited with mapping the Taklamakan Mountains and discovering the Cave of Thousand Buddhas in Duanhuang.

===== Soldiers =====
Sikhs soldiers in the British Indian Army arrived in China soon after the annexation of the Sikh Empire, with Sikh soldiers taking part in the Taiping Rebellion (1850–1864), Second Opium War (1856–60), Boxer Rebellion (1899–1901), and World War I in China.

The British utilized the Sikh Regiment during the Taiping Rebellion.

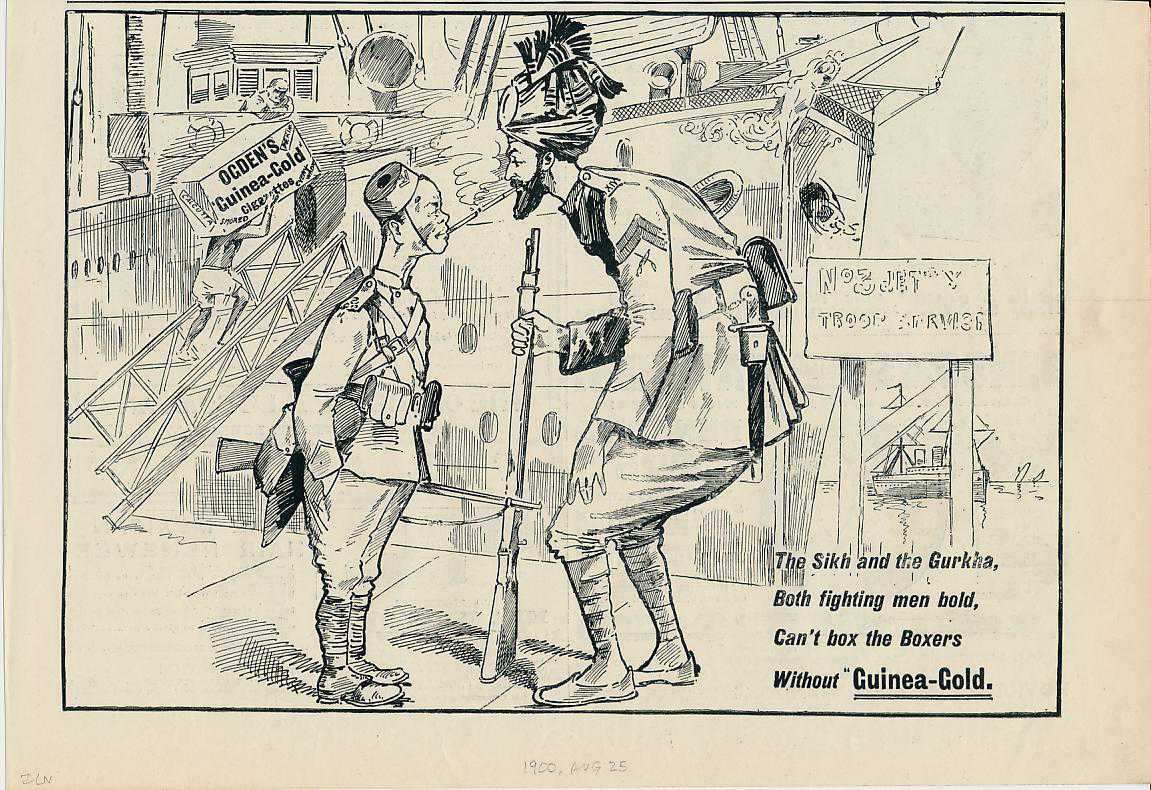
'Guinea-Gold' cigarette advertisement featuring a Sikh and Gurkha soldier during the Boxer Rebellion of China, 25th of August, 1900.

In the Second Opium War, the Sikhs participated as part of the 15th Punjab Pioneers. The Sikh soldiers who participated in the action of the Second Opium War almost entirely drew from the Mazhabi caste and were around 1,000 men in-total. They departed from Lucknow on 11 February 1860 and arrived in Hong Kong via the Calcutta to Singapore route. On June 1, the Mazhabi Sikh troops sailed for Northern China. Peh-tang surrendered by the end of July, the capture of Taku Fort followed, and the next site of action would be Tientsin, with the city being surrounded by the allied coalition by September 5. Next, they marched toward Peking, which fell to the allies and a treaty was signed on 13 October 1860 by Lord Elgin and the Chinese. Following the capture of Peking, the Mazhabi Sikh soldiers participated in the looting of the Old Summer Palace, bringing treasures back to India afterwards as a result. The Sikh soldiers in the Pioneers left Peking on November 9, embarking from Tientsin, for Hong Kong, and then onward returning to India. After the war, the Sikh soldiers of the Pioneers who saw action were awarded the China Medal with two clasps: 'Taku Forts, 1860', and 'Peking, 1860'.

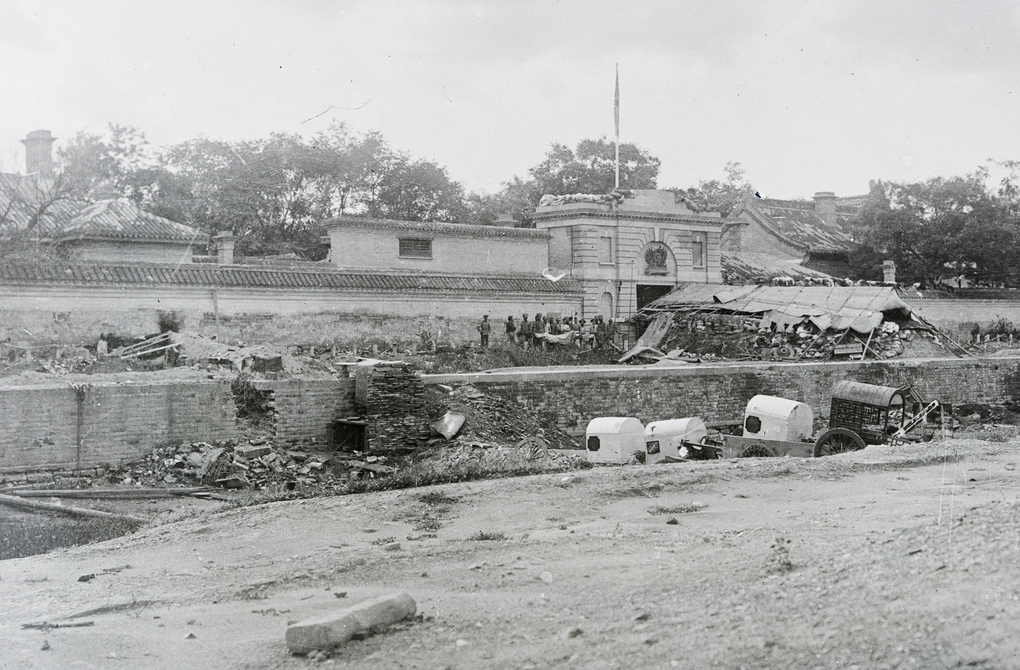
Sikh troops in front of the barricaded entrance to the British Legation during the Boxer Rebellion, Peking, August 1900

During the Boxer Rebellion, the 24th Punjab Regiment saw action during the Battle of Yang Tsun alongside the 14th American Regiment, with the battle ending by a joint American-Sikh bayonet charge. A relief force of 3,000 soldiers from Sikh Regiments helped lift the siege on Beijing by the Boxers.

During World War I, Sikh soldiers were stationed as part of the Garrison of Tianjin in China, participating in the Siege of Tsingtao. On November 7, 1914, both regiments of the 24th Sikhs and half the 36th Sikhs were sent from Tientsin in September 1914 as representatives of the Allies and participate in the capture of Tsingtao from the Germans.

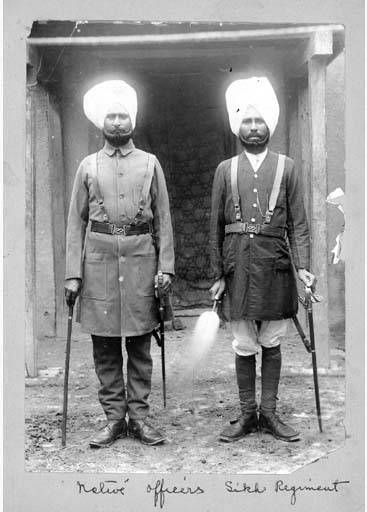
Officers of the Sikh Regiment, Tianjin, 1900

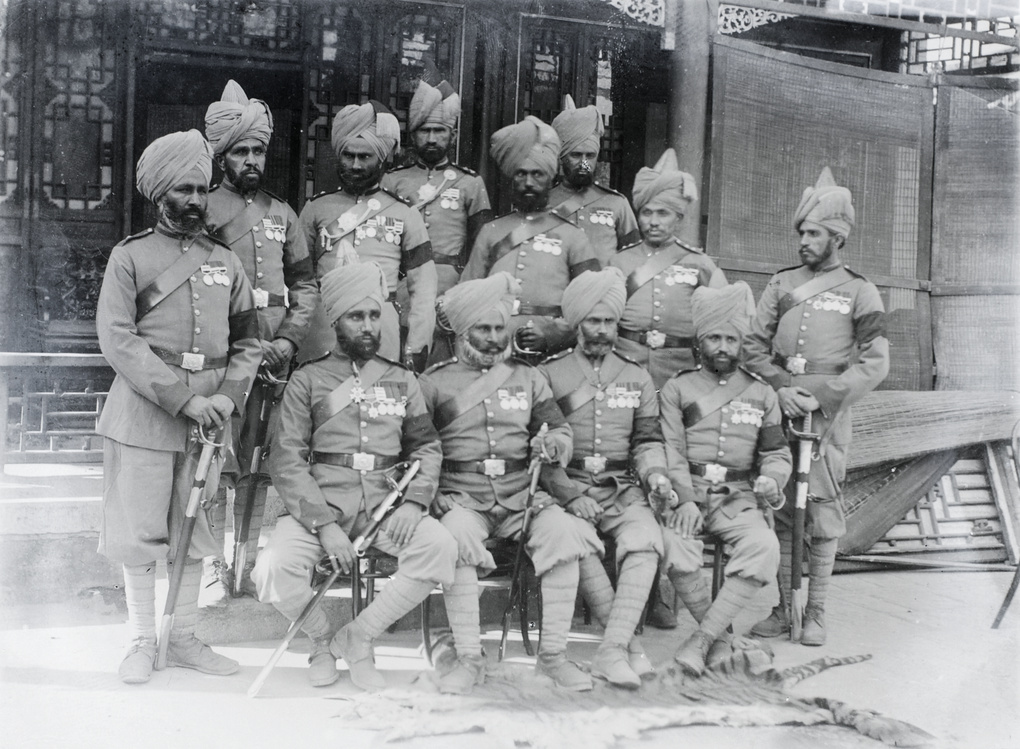
Sikh and Muslim soldiers with medals, Indian Army, Beijing, c. 1900

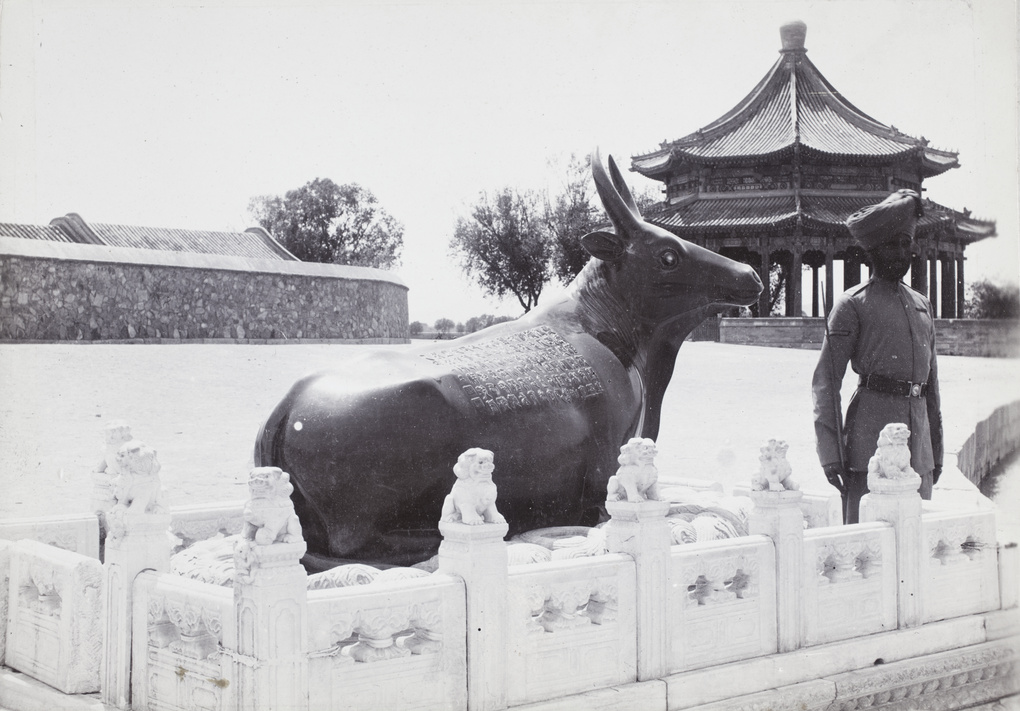
Sikh soldier guarding the Bronze Ox, Summer Palace, Beijing, c. 1900

===== Policemen =====
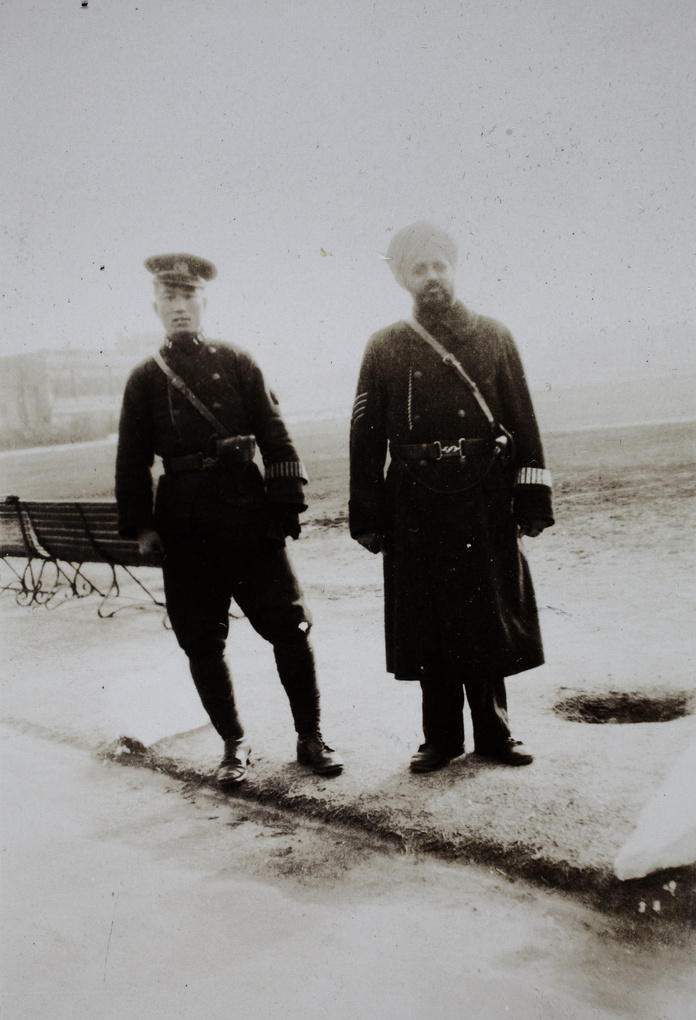
Chinese and Sikh policemen (S.M.P.), Shanghai, c. 1930

During the 1800s and 1900s, many Sikh Punjabi people were recruited from British India to work as officers for the Shanghai Municipal Police and Hong Kong Police. The British could not recruit enough European men to serve as policemen in China and European recruits were too expensive. However, the British were reluctant to hire too many Chinese men for the role as they did not trust the Chinese, so they decided to hire Sikhs from the Punjab to fill the positions.

A contingent of Sikh policemen arrived in Hong Kong in 1867. Recruitment of Sikhs in the Shanghai police-force began in 1884 and the recruitment of Sikhs in the Tianjin police-force began in 1886 or 1896. Indian Sikhs were also employed by the British to work as policemen in Tientsin (Tianjin), Amoy (Xiamen), and Hankow (Hankou, Wuhan). Initially, recruitment for these police roles in China were done directly in India but as time went on and more Sikhs settled in the Far East looking for work, more recruits came from local Sikhs who resided in China already.

====== Shanghai Police ======
The Shanghai International Police was founded in 1854, responsible for policing the International Settlement of Shanghai (until 1943), and it was deployed by the British at ports important to British commercial interests in the early 20th century. A Sikh branch of the Shanghai International Police was established in 1884, being founded by Sikh ex-military men who had been stationed in China. This Sikh-specific police branch reached a size of 800 policemen, almost all of whom were Sikh. The first batch of Sikhs who joined the Shanghai police consisted of one inspector and fifteen constables. This first batch of Sikh policemen in Shanghai were stationed out of Gordon Road police station. (Note: The road is known as 'Jiangning Road' today.) By 1886, some Sikhs in the Shanghai Police were tasked with working as traffic controlmen and street patrollers in the International Settlement. These Sikh policemen wore khakis in the summertime and heavy, dark coats during the wintertime. A black-and-white truncheon was carried by the Sikh traffic policemen to frighten the Chinese, particularly rickshaw drivers. Sikh policemen also worked as riot police.

Sikh policemen in Shanghai were paid considerably less than their White counterparts but slightly more than their fellow Chinese policemen. According to Shanghai in Foreign Concession by Ma Changlin, Sikhs policemen were "easy to train and control" and "inclined to obey instructions and disciplined."

By 1920 there were 573 policemen in Sikh branch. In 1930, out of the 691 Indian policemen who were employed by the Shanghai International Settlement police, 594 were constables and 88 were sergeants. As per the Shanghai Municipal Police force's Indian unit's terms of service, there was a rule that a Sikh policeman had to serve the force for at-least five years before he could become eligible to be promoted to havildar (equivalent to a sergeant). It was practically impossible for any Sikh policeman from an ordinary background to be promoted to the rank of jemadar, which was the highest possible rank for a Sikh serving in the unit. By 1936, out of the total 4,739 policemen of the Shanghai Municipal Police, 558 of them were Sikhs belonging to the Sikh contingent. The Indian police unit of the SMP was disbanded in 1945 and its remaining policemen were repatriated back to India or moved to Hong Kong or Singapore.

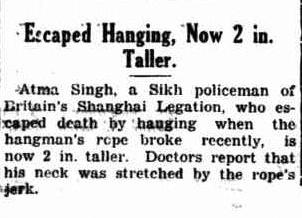
Shanghainese newspaper clipping reporting on the miraculous survival of convicted murderer Atma Singh, whose execution failed when the noose broke, c. 1937

Two prominent Sikh policemen of Shanghai remembered in infamy are Bawa Singh and Atma Singh. On a late night in 1936, Bawa visited the home of Atma, where Atma's wife was sleeping. Atma's wife demanded that Bawa leave the premises, an order which he obliged. When Atma came to learn that Bawa visited his wife late into the night, he searched for him while wielding a meat cleaver, finding Bawa at a quarry at the Pootoo Road Police Station on Gordon Road. Atma then assaulted Bawa, nearly dismembering both of the victim's forearms and causing a deep wound on his forehead. Bawa died later in hospital and the incident caused a big stir in Shanghai at the time. Bawa was sentenced to death by hanging but on the day of the hanging, the rope broke and Bawa survived the attempted execution. Thereafter, Bawa's sentence was commuted to life imprisonment, and he served his sentence in India. Some members of the local Sikh community at the time considered the failed execution as a miracle of divine intervention.

Number of Sikh policemen in the Shanghai Police
Year	Number
1884	16
1910	159
1920	513
1934	634
1940	529 or 557
1942	464

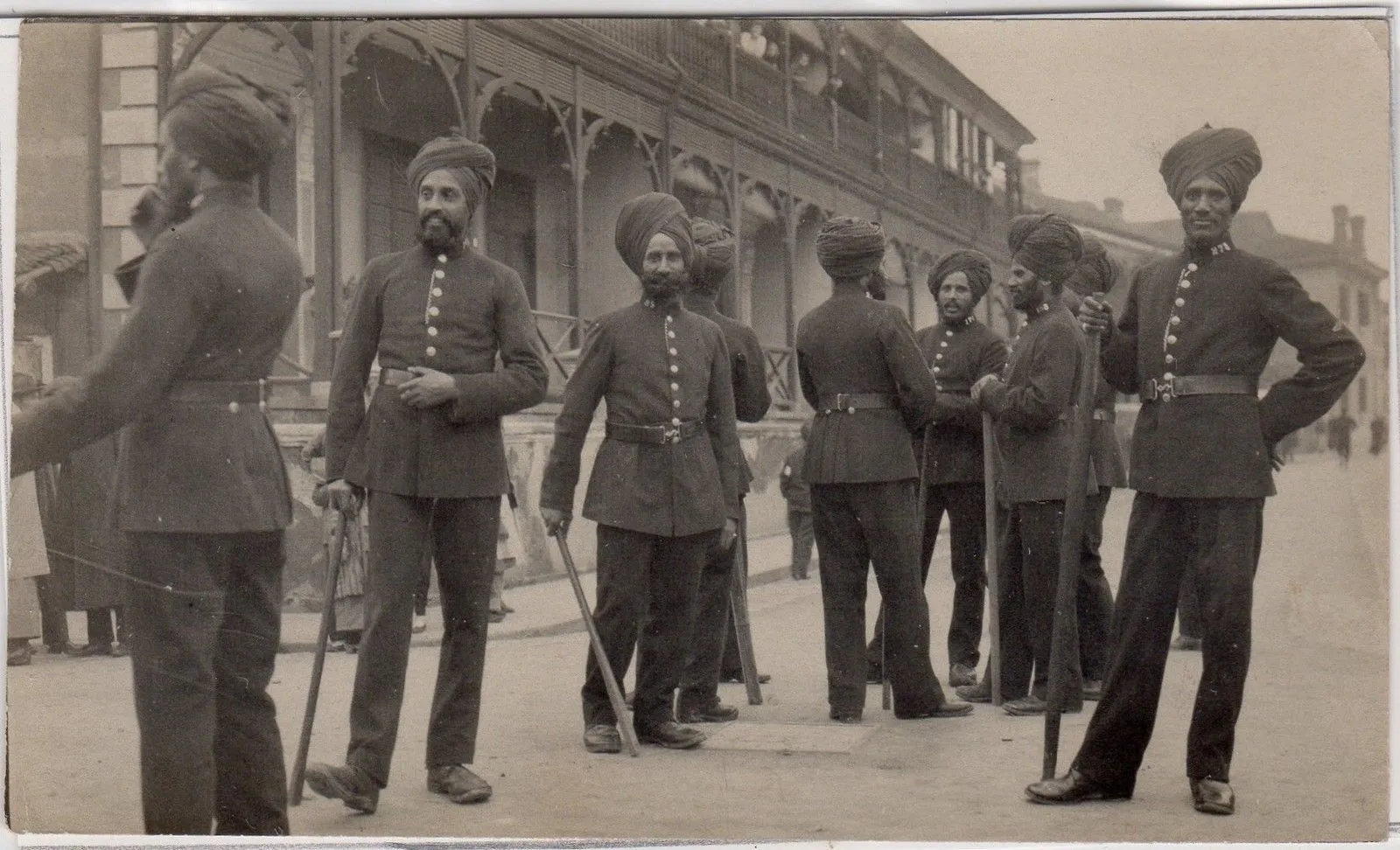
Sikh policemen at the time of the 1905 Shanghai riots

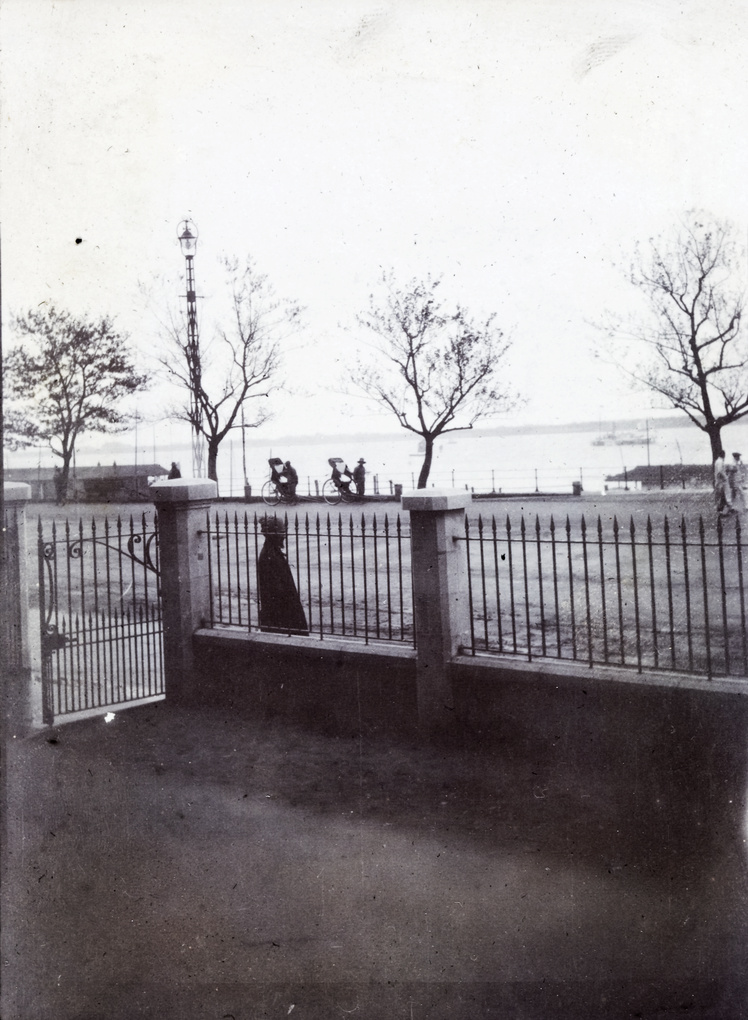
Sikh policeman, Hankow Bund, China, ca.1910–20

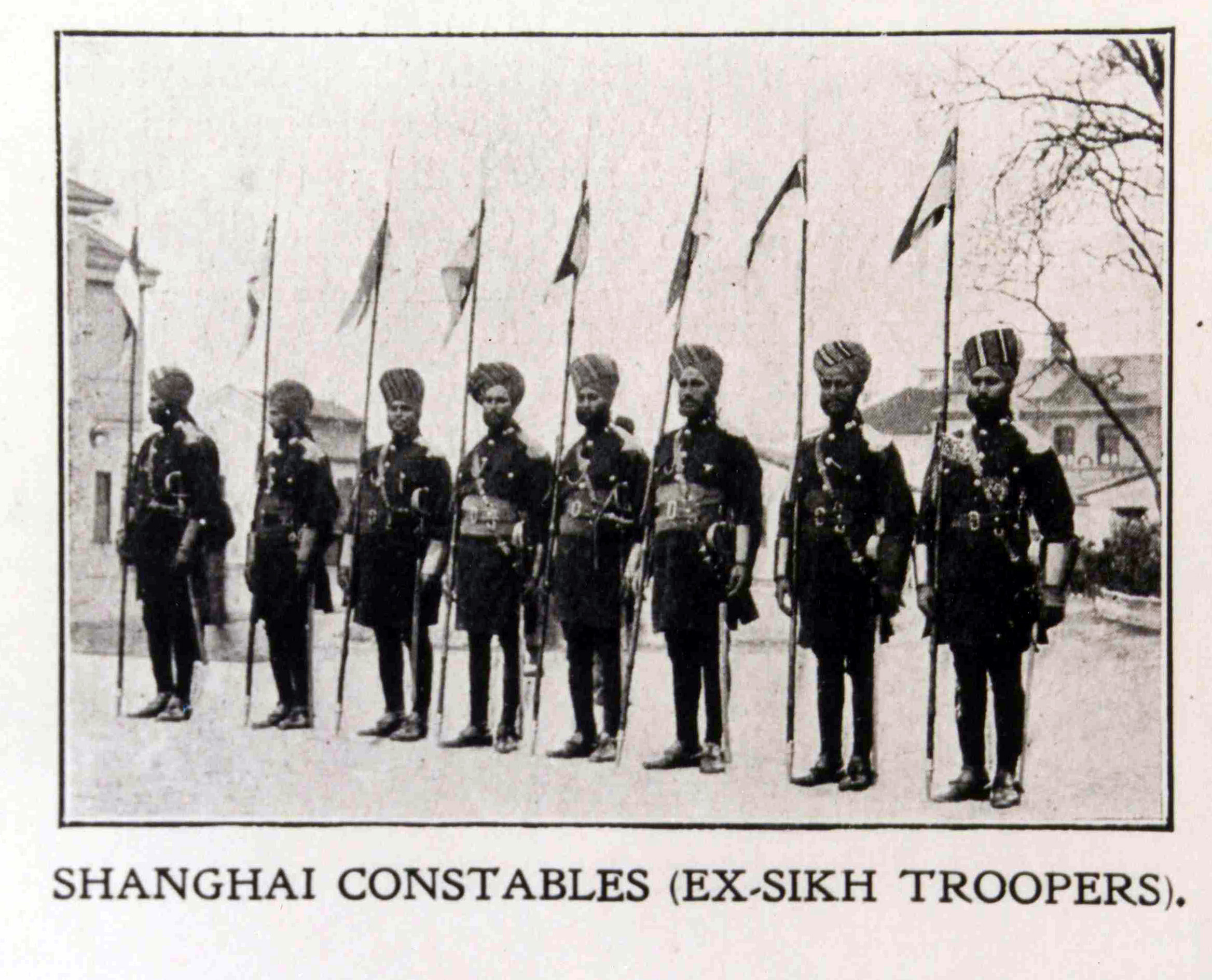
Shanghai constables (Sikh troopers), International Settlement, Shanghai, c. 1915–1935

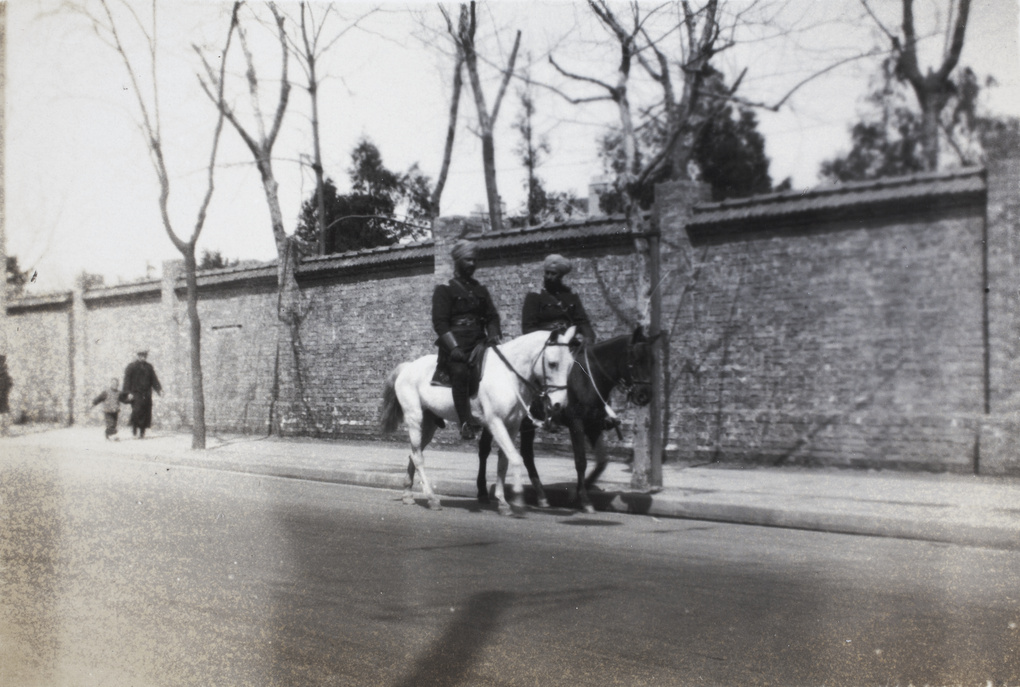
Sikh policemen on horseback, Shanghai, c. 1930

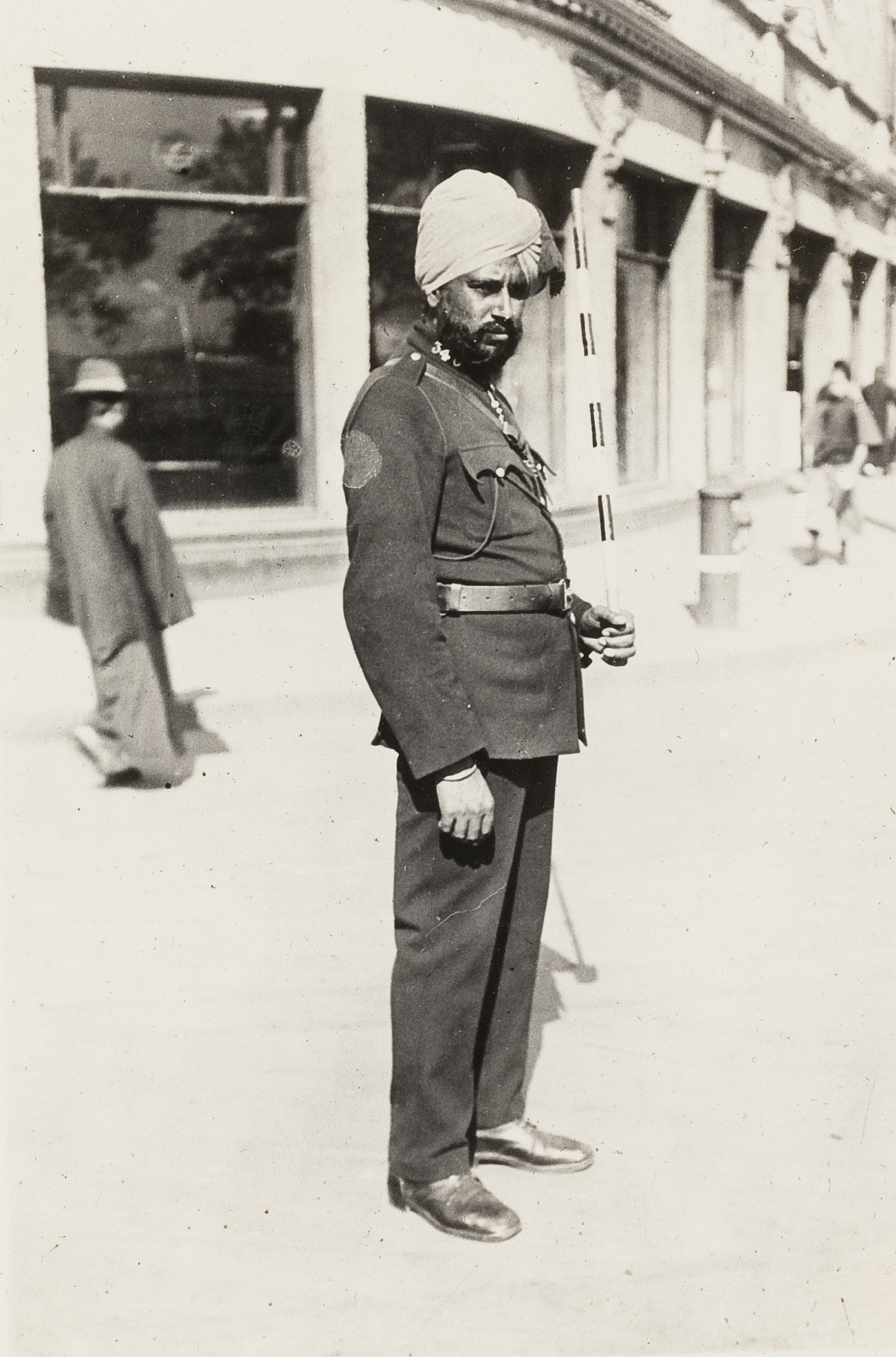
Sikh policeman in Shanghai, c. 1933

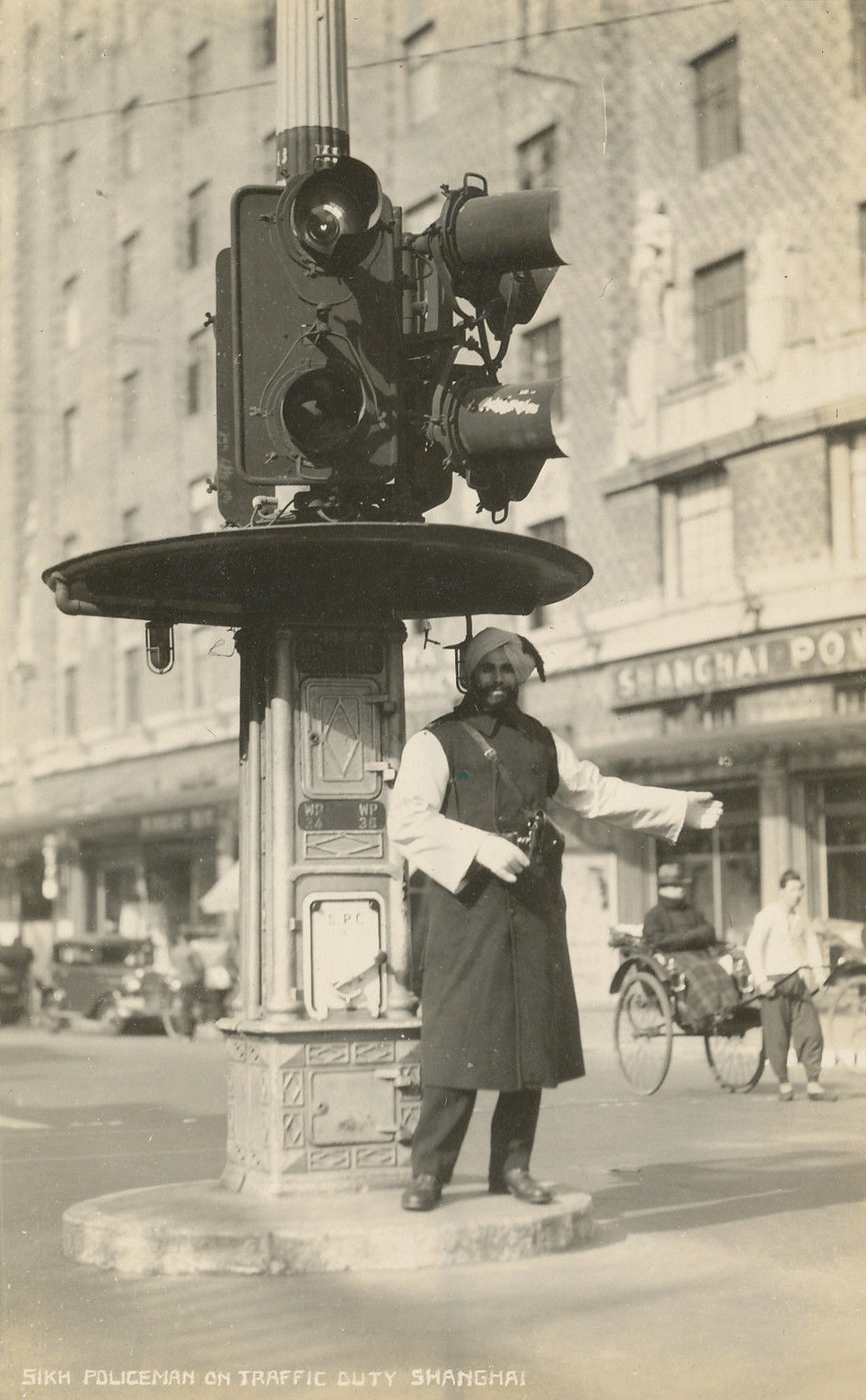
Sikh policeman directing traffic inside Shanghai's International Settlement, c. 1935

===== Guards and watchmen =====
Outside of policing professions, Shanghai-based Sikhs at the time also worked as watchmen or guards at banks, wharves, nightclubs, and hotels. Many Sikhs were employed as prison guards. Between 1925 and 1930, the Ward Road Gaol (now Tilanqao Prison) became a prison, it mainly housed inmates of a Chinese background and the staff were mostly British and Sikhs. The majority of the warders were Sikhs. The prison had a very bad reputation for poor conditions.

===== Money-lenders =====
Most Sikhs also had a side-job of money-lending, as per Ralph Shaw's Sin City. Sikh money-lenders had a reputation of being "ruthless" and charging highly excessive rates to their debtors. Many of the Chinese debtors of the Sikh money-lenders defaulted on their debts, which meant they would become indebted for the rest of their lives.

===== Other professions =====
Some Sikhs in Shanghai also worked as warehouse workers, at big-business hongs, and as commissionaires at hotels, restaurants, and nightclubs.

==== Relationship between local Chinese and Sikhs in colonial China ====
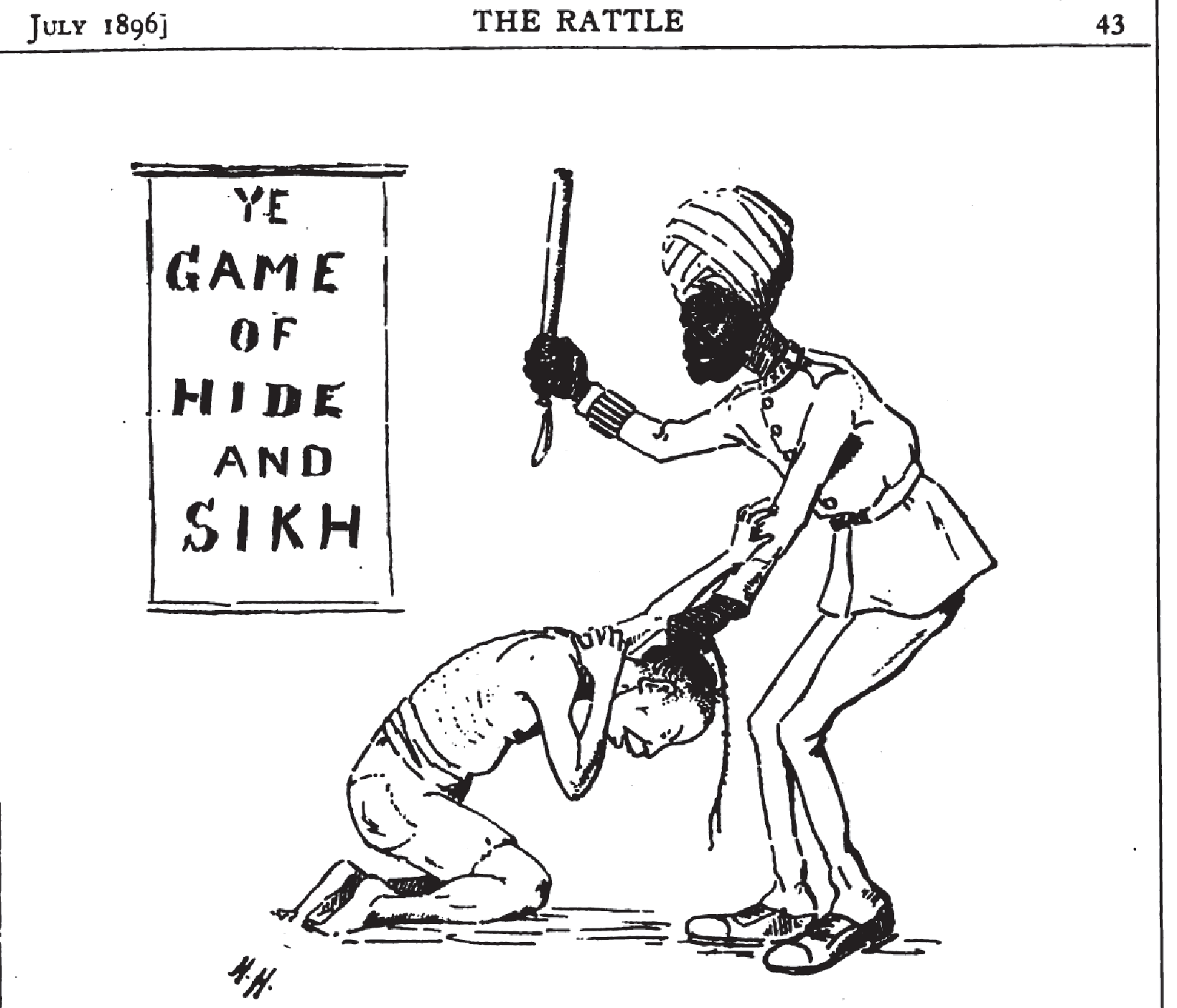
Caricature of a Shanghai Sikh policeman beating a Chinese "coolie", from 'The Rattle', July 1896

Many of the local Shanghainese are said to have disliked the Sikh policemen of Shanghai, viewing them as abusers of the local population (specifically rickshaw drivers and hawkers) with little or no provocation, subjecting victims to shoe and baton beatings. The Shanghainese derided the Sikh policemen as being "dogs" of their British overlords and called them "annoying red-hat flies". Many Sikhs refused to eat food prepared by Chinese people based on caste-based beliefs. Due to this, interactions between the local Chinese and Sikh communities were limited and unintegrated with one another.

However, Claude Markovits remarked that these harsh actions by the Sikh policemen were necessary for keeping the locals in-check and obedient to the law. He specifically remarks that local rickshaw drivers tended to drive dangerously, posing risks to the surrounding traffic, and that the Chinese held little regard for laws and rules of the administration, often urinating and spitting in public areas. Furthermore, Sikh policemen dispersed gangs of local Chinese engaging in gambling and fights.

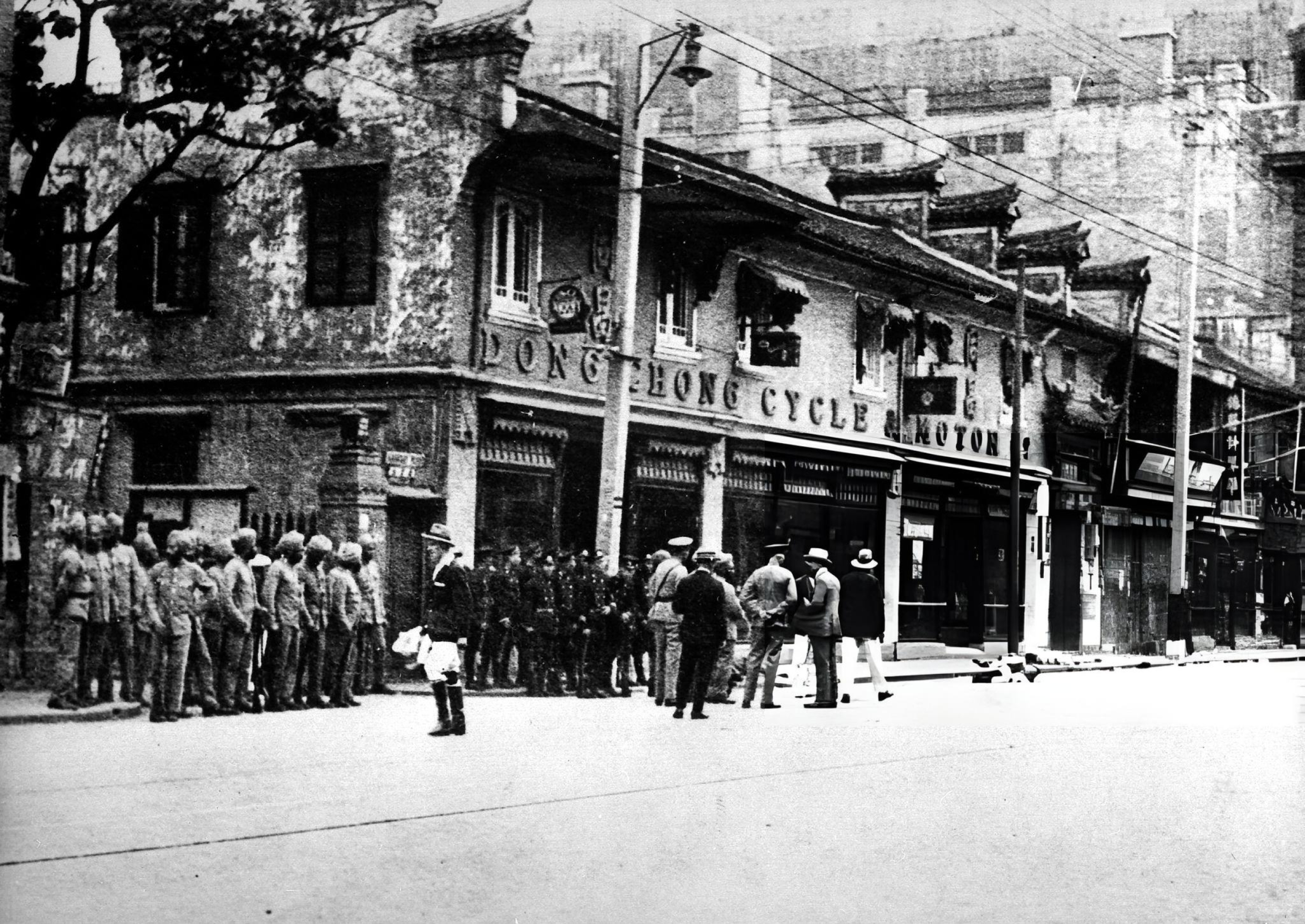
Photograph of Nanking Road, Shanghai just after the Nanking Road Incident (now spelt as 'Nanjing'), 30 May 1925. Sikh troops reinforcing Chinese soldiery, with two casualties of the incident visible in the frame of the image towards the right-side lying in the roadway.

During the 1913 China unrest, Stafford M. Cox reported to the chairman of the Shanghai Municipal Council, Edward Charles Pearce, on 29 July 1913 that Chinese youth stated that they could live with Chinese or foreigners guarding the city but that they would resist "black slaves" (referring to Sikhs). According to Frank Dikötter, during the late Qing and early Republican periods of Chinese history, Sikhs were classified as "black" and therefore inferior even to the "White imperialists" (Europeans) in Chinese eyes.

During the May Thirtieth Movement in 1925, on the orders of Inspector Edward Everson, Sikh policemen, alongside Chinese policemen, opened fire on anti-imperialist Chinese protesters at Louza Police Station on Nanjing Road, which led to many casualties, including nine fatalities. The Sikh policemen were solely blamed for this incident by the local Chinese, even though Chinese policemen also were involved in the firing. This incident triggered further unrest against foreigners and imperialism throughout China.

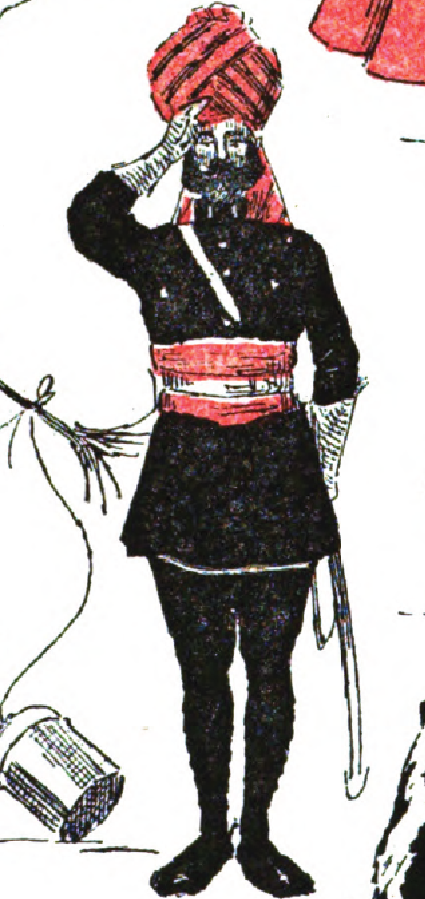
Caricature of a Shanghai Sikh policeman wearing the standard, red-turbaned uniform, from 'The Rattle', 1896

A local slur used against Sikhs developed based on the uniform of the Sikhs. The Shanghainese called Sikh policemen Hong Tou Ah-San (Shanghainese: 紅头阿三, romanized: hhongdhou'akse, lit. 'red-headed number three', IPA: [ɦòŋ̩dɤ̋.ᴀ̄ʔsᴇ᷆]; Mandarin Chinese: hóngtóu ā sān), which was in-reference to the Sikh policemen's red-turban (uniform worn by traffic wardens) and them being third in-rank on the hierarchal, social classification system (British as the first in-rank and the Chinese ranked second, Indians ranked third below both). However, another theory is that the "a san" portion has nothing to do with the number three but rather is an imitation of how the Sikh policemen were addressed by the Shanghainese with the words "I say!" or "Oh sir!", which sounds similar to Aye Sir in their local dialect. Some believe the phrase is derived from the English phrase "I see". Meena Vathyam states that the Sikhs in Shanghai used pidgin English they had learnt, so they would say "I savvy", which when transliterated to Chinese becomes "A-san". The Hong Tou Ah-San term can be interpreted in various ways, from less extreme to pejridicial. Hongtou Asan can variously be translated as "red-headed monkeys", "red-headed rascals", or "turbaned number threes" in English.

The local Shanghainese also referred to Sikhs as "black devils" (Chinese: 黑鬼, romanized: Hēi guǐ, lit. 'black devil') due to considering them as belonging to an "inferior race". In the eyes of the local Chinese, the Sikhs were heigui who were under the command of baigui (Chinese: 白鬼, romanized: Bái guǐ, lit. 'white devil'), the British. Another term used against Sikhs by local Chinese was "red-bottomed monkeys". Sikhs also were referred to as "big-headed ghosts" (Chinese: 大头鬼) by local Chinese.

According to Cao Yin, the animosity that local Chinese people held against the Sikhs at the time was fueled by their internalized racial hierarchical categorization: the Chinese considered themselves temporarily "inferior" to the White race by the current circumstances (whilst believing that they had the potential to become equals to the White race) but as "superior" to the Indian race, thus Sikhs being in a position of power as policemen over "superior" Chinese people fueled their hatred toward them. Colourism also played a role, since Sikhs tended to be darker-skinned than the Chinese. Meena Vathyam postulates that the local Chinese felt humiliated by and resented that Sikhs, fellow Asians from a neighbouring country, were imposing British-made laws on them.

According to Claude Markovitz, since most Sikh men in China were bachelors or had left their wives back in India, many of them had to turn to local prostitutes to satisfy their sexual and emotional needs. Most Sikh men visiting prostitutes were clients of ethnic Chinese prostitutes, as their rates were affordable for them. However, a minority of the Sikh men in China found deeper connections and actual romance with local Chinese women, with some even going as far as marrying a local Chinese woman in many cases. The mixed-race children of such couples were very stigmatized as both the Indian and Chinese community at the time looked down upon interracial marriages. Markovitz further claims that Sikh men in China tended to do well with local women due to their attractive physiques.

There is evidence of ethnic Chinese visiting the Shanghai Gurdwara whilst it was active as a Sikh temple. An account of a Chinese woman who lived next door to the Sikh temple states she used to visit the gurdwara as a child and that Sikhs bringing a lot of milk would come. The local Chinese referred to the Shanghai Gurdwara as Yindu Miao (Chinese: 印度庙, romanized: Yìndù miào, lit. 'Indian temple').

In August 1909 on a Sunday, a Sikh residing in Shanghai by the name of Nidhan Singh married an ethnic Chinese woman at the Dongbaoxing Road gurdwara. The Chinese bride was a native of Pootung (Pudong), had a well-known desire to convert to Sikhism that was known to the Indian community, and she was very happy to be married. This Chinese woman converted to Sikhism and was baptized as Gursharan Kaur whilst her husband was baptized as Jagjit Singh in an Amrit Sanchar ceremony. The wedding ceremony itself was an Anand Karaj, where the bride was led by the groom four times in a circumambulation around the Guru Granth Sahib, with a bow given before the scripture after every revolution. A large amount of local Sikhs attended the interracial Sino-Sikh wedding, including 20 women. This was the first interracial Chinese-Sikh wedding to take place at the Dongbaoxing Road gurdwara.

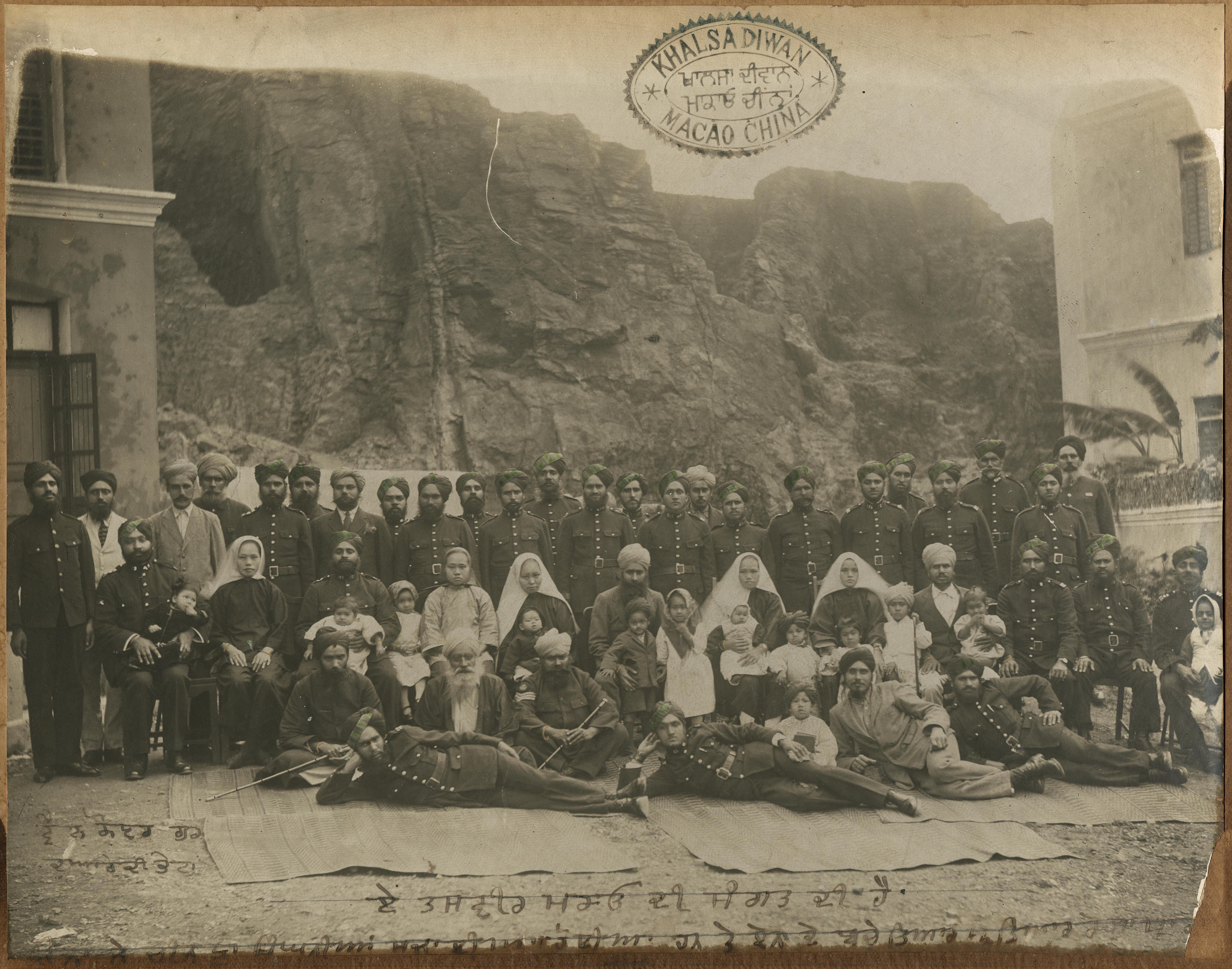
Sikh men of Macau with Chinese wives and their mixed-race children, Khalsa Diwan Macau, China, 27 March 1927

On 27 March 1927, a photograph was taken showcasing the Sikh congregation of the local Khalsa Diwan chapter in Macau. In the photograph, Sikh men can be seen posing with their local Chinese wives and mixed-race children.

Some Shanghai Sikh families employed Chinese women as amahs, such as in the case with the Sangha family.

Sikh policemen in Shanghai were taught the Shanghainese dialect, the local Wu lect spoken in the city, by the Shanghai Municipal Council.

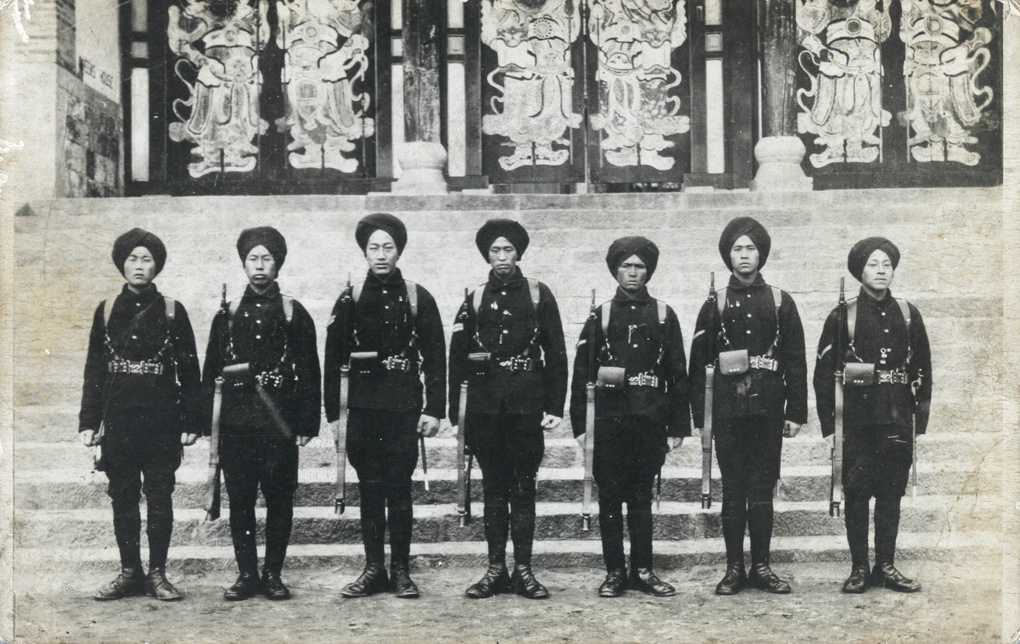
1st Chinese Regiment soldiers, outside Queen's House, Weihaiwei, China. The turbans of the 1st Chinese Regiment was adopted from Sikhs.

According to Barbara-Sue White, the turbans worn by members of the 1st Chinese Regiment (also known as the Weihaiwei Regiment) was an adoption of the turbans worn by Sikhs.

==== Sikh women in colonial China ====
Sikh women also resided with their Sikh husbands during the colonial-era of Shanghai. Most Sikh soldiers in Shanghai arrived as bachelors, however some were already married and would bring their wives with them to Shanghai at a later date. The lives of Sikh women in Shanghai during the colonial period was centered on the gurdwara for their socialization and communal needs. The Indian clothing (such as the shalwar kameez and dupatta) worn by Sikh women in Shanghai are said to have aroused the curiosity of local Chinese onlookers. However, since their husbands were "symbols of oppression" in Shanghai, there were barriers between the local Chinese and Sikh women.

===== Princess Sumair =====
In the 1940s, Princess Sumair, who claimed to be a familial relative of maharaja Bhupinder Singh of Patiala State, she also claimed to be the cousin of famous Sikh painter Amrita Shergil, resided in Shanghai during the period of Japanese-occupation and lived a scandalous lifestyle focused on money, fashion and men. (Note: Various sources have described her relationship to Bhupinder Singh of Patiala State as her being either a sister, daughter, or niece of his.) She was described as a "nymphomaniac" and "worshipper of lesbian cult" by Bernard Wasserstein in Secret War in Shanghai. She arrived in Shanghai in July 1940 after being disowned by her family due to her reportedly "loose morals" and her real name was Rajkumari Sumair Apjit Singh. She became entangled with the Axis during her time in Shanghai. She was bisexual and bigamous, as she married a Japanese-American man without divorcing her Indian husband. It is rumoured she eloped with an American soldier and disappeared from Shanghai. However, later events of her life in Europe and America are on historical record, where she worked as a fashion designer and seller.

==== Sikh revolutionary activities in colonial China ====
Many Shanghai-based Sikhs were pro-Indian revolutionaries, being supporters of the Ghadar Party and also of the Indian National Army. On 16 November 1910 during the Guru Nanak Gurpurab celebrations, Duleep Singh, a Sikh who was a Shanghai Tramways employee, was arrested for giving a provocative anti-British speech to assembled crowd of Sikh watchmen and ex-policemen.

The Shanghai Gurdwara became a centre of activity for the Ghadarites based in India and across the globe between the years 1913–17. Both pro-British and anti-British views occupied the same space of the gurdwara, leading to tensions. Speeches given and literature produced by the Ghadarites promoted sedition against the British overlords. In 1914, the Ghadar newspaper began to be circulated in Shanghai. In 1915 during the Guru Nanak Gurpurab celebration, a pro-British speech was given at the Dong Baoxing Road Gurdwara in-which it was stated that true Sikhs are loyal to the British and rousing for anti-British Sikhs to be arrested.

In July 1915, two Ghadarite Sikhs, Kesar Singh and Ganda Singh (both may have worked either as policemen or watchmen), attacked the secretary of the Dong Baoxing Road Gurdwara, Boota Singh. Kesar and Ganda were sentenced to nine months imprisonment for their actions. By 1917, the Ghadar movement in Shanghai was extinguished by the British and its Sikh supporters were executed by hanging or deported based on treason.

During the 1920s and 1930s, Shanghai-based Sikhs also helped the Chinese nationalist movement by trying to overthrow British hegemony in Shanghai and shutting down British activities in the city. Harbaksh Singh was a mastermind of the Indian nationalist activities and published seditious material as the editor of the Hindu Jagawa from the Hindustan Association in the Rue du Consulat within the French Concession. On 29 June 1925, an Akali Jatha consisting of 25-men from Shanghai arrived in Bombay via the China mail-steamer, Sicilia, to participate in the Jaito Morcha of the Gurdwara Reform movement.

During the Second Sino-Japanese War and Japanese occupation of Shanghai, older generations of Sikhs tended to remain loyal to the British whilst younger Sikhs were inclined toward anti-British activities, such as joining the Indian National Army.

According to Yin Cao, the role that Shanghai-based Sikhs played in both the Indian independence movement and Chinese nationalist movement has been disregarded by both the national histories of modern India and China. According to him, the Chinese national history focuses on the contributions made by the Chinese themselves, ignoring non-Chinese who assisted with their nationalist movement. Meanwhile, the Indian national history focuses on the efforts of the Indian National Congress, and ignores the efforts of the Sikh diaspora in the independence movement.

On 2 August 1914, a Ghadarite Sikh writer stated the following:

ਚੀਨੇ ਭਾਈ ਹਨ ਵੀਰਨੋ ਐਸ਼ਿਆ ਦੇ, ਭਾਈਆਂ ਨਾਲ ਨਾ ਤੁਸਾਂ ਫਸਾ ਜਾਵੇ ।
ਸਗੋਂ ਤੁਸਾਂ ਕਰਨੀ ਮਦਤ ਚੀਨਿਆਂ ਦੀ, ਦੁਸ਼ਮਣ ਉਹਨਾਂ ਨੂੰ ਮਤਾਂ ਦਬਾ ਜਾਵੇ ।
ਹਿੰਦ ਚੀਨ ਟਰਕੀ ਸਕੇ ਹੈਨ ਭਾਈ, ਵੈਰੀ ਇਹਨਾਂ ਨੂੰ ਦਾਗ ਨਾ ਲਾ ਜਾਵੇ ।

— ਦੁਖੀਆ ਸਿੰਘ
Translation:

Remember Chinese are brothers; let not the enemy tell you otherwise
Instead you should support the Chinese, let the enemy not suppress them
Hindustan, Turkey, China are like real brothers, allow not the enemy to defeat them!

— Dukhia Singh

In the Kirti issue of August 1927, the Ghadarite Sikhs appealed to the Chinese nationalists to help protect their right of asylum by shielding Dasaundha Singh from being arrested.

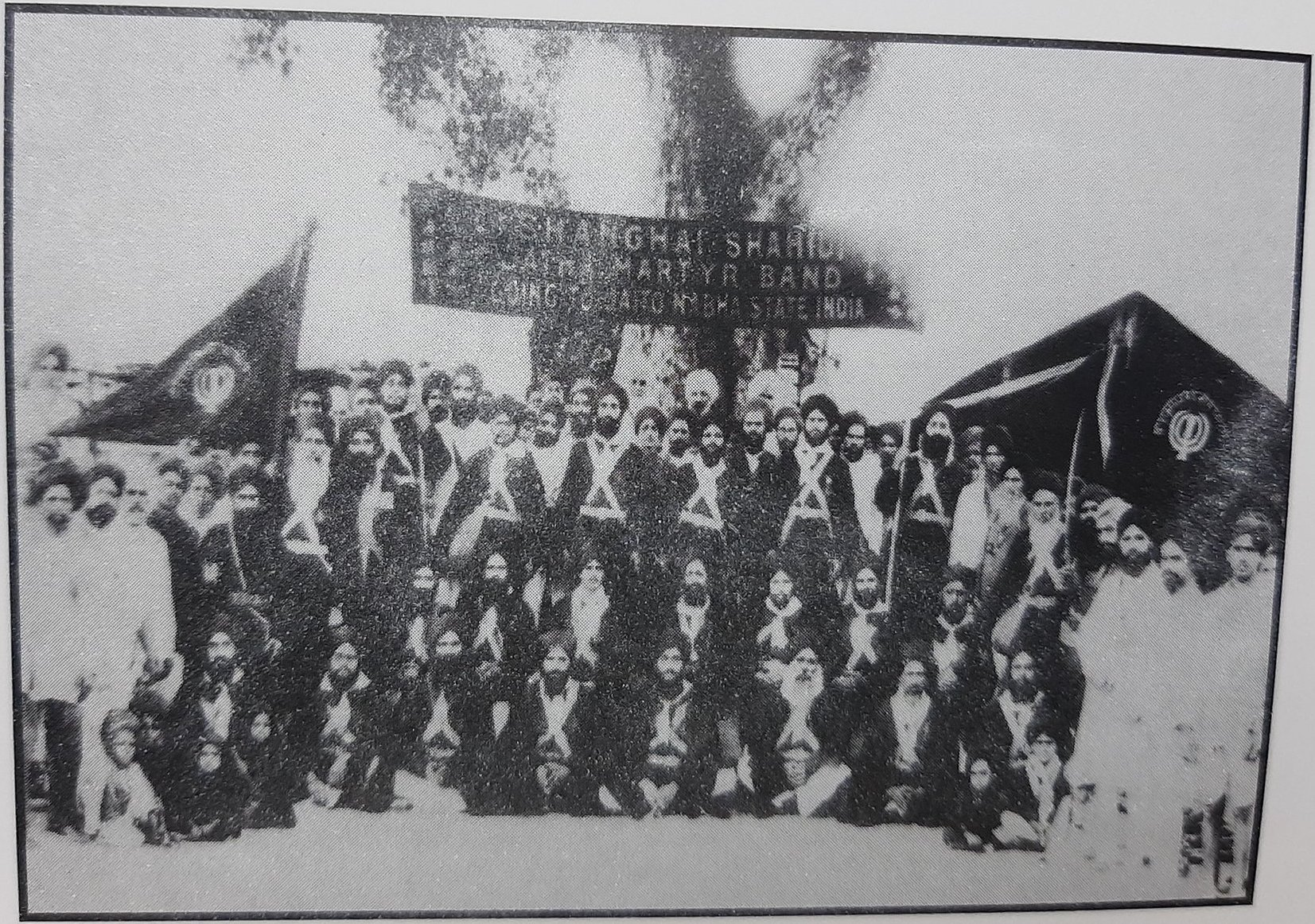
Photograph of a Jatha (band) of Shanghai-based Sikhs who came to Punjab to participate in the Jaito Morcha of February 1924.

===== Assassination of Buddha Singh =====
Buddha Singh was born in the Majha region of the Punjab in the 1870s and moved to Shanghai from India in February 1902 to join the Shanghai Municipal Police force. Buddha rose through the police ranks quickly, becoming a havildar in February 1906 and becoming a jemadar in 1911, which was remarkable given his background. He also worked as a treasurer for the local Sikh community and in 1908 he was bestowed with the position as the Sikh community's secretary. The Shanghai Municipal Police decided to use the rising-stardom of Buddha Singh to achieve their own interests. Buddha Singh, a highly ranked officer (jemadar), was captain E. I. M. Barrett's informant on the happenings within the Dong Baoxing Road Gurdwara, as the gurdwara commonly housed the impoverished, misfortunate, and travellers for free. After the start of World War I, Buddha Singh was pro-active at stomping-out anti-British currents within the local Sikh community. In July 1914, he began investigating the circulation of a Ghadarite publication and found out that seven members of the Sikh community who were Ghadarites were responsible for the distribution of the seditious Ghadar newspaper. Furthermore, he uncovered that these seven men also acted as recruiters of local Sikh men for Ghadarite activities in India, also being responsible for their transport. The findings of his investigation were forwarded to the Shanghai Municipal Police and Buddha advocated that these seven men should be arrested. However, the Ghadarites caught wind of this and burnt the seditious newspapers and absconded from Shanghai. In the morning of 15 July 1914, days after Buddha Singh gave the list of the names of the seven Ghadarites to the S.M.P., he was attacked by an ex-policeman named Lal Singh who wielded a heavy stick. Lal Singh was a Ghadar member himself and was friends with the seven men accused. On 25 July 1914, Buddha Singh was attacked by a group of three Ghadarite Sikhs, who tried to blind Buddha by aiming for his eyes and head during the attack after knocking him over. As a result of this attack, Buddha was in a state of unconsciousness for several days. A month earlier in June 1914, Buddha had received a Ghadarite threat-letter which accused him of being disloyal to the Indian people and that he will be killed as a result.

On 21 November 1915 during the Guru Nanak Gurpurab celebrations at the Dong Baoxing Road Gurdwara, Buddha Singh was in charge of the celebration and during it, a resolution was passed that requested all Shanghai-based Sikhs to declare their loyalty to the British Raj and dedicate themselves to the British during the First World War. Buddha Singh founded the Shanghai Sikh Scout Troop in August 1917 to promote patriotism and obedience amongst the Sikh youth of Shanghai. He also campaigned a movement to promote donations to be made to the Red Cross by the Shanghai Sikh community for the benefit of wounded Sikh soldiers in the war. During the First World War, there was little activity against the British in Shanghai by Sikhs and Buddha's efforts did not go wasted to achieve this result. In 1917, the Shanghai Municipal Council graded the Sikh unit of the S.M.P. as "excellent" as there was no reported cases of insubordination and there was good discipline exhibited.

In 1917, Buddha Singh was conferred the title of Sirdar Sahib by the Shanghai Municipal Police due to his pro-British work during the First World War, and the Sikh Women's Association gifted him a gold Sikh emblem at the gurdwara. The Sirdar Sahib title had been the most prestigious title that a Sikh in Shanghai had been bestowed with by the British yet. The ceremony for bestowing the title on Buddha Singh was held at the British Consulate, with attendance by all the highly-prominent British officials of Shanghai. Buddha Singh was presented with the insignia by Everard Fraser himself, who was the British Consul-General at the time. Many local Sikhs were angry at Buddha Singh, whom they characterized as a puppet of the British, believing he misappropriated the gurdwara's funds to brown-nose British officials with gifts. Death threats against Buddha's life were commonplace. On 3 October 1923, Buddha was travelling aboard a ship that was heading to Hong Kong when four Sikhs told him that he will be killed in the future and that whoever kills him will be considered a martyr. In his communications with his friends, Buddha Singh often remarked that the death threats against his life were serious and that he would one day be killed.

In January 1924, an article titled One Who Seeks the Blood of His Brethren for His Own Personal Benefit published in the Hind Jagawa by Harbaksh Singh of the Rue du Consulat severely criticized Buddha Singh and stated that he was "the one who seeks the blood of his brethren for his own benefit". Furthermore, Buddha Singh was accused of misappropriating gurdwara funds to buy gifts for British officials to curry up favour to them. This article was considered seditious and therefore Harbaksh Singh was remanded to custody in Amoy Road Gaol. Harbaksh Singh was charged with published seditious literature that would lead to a breaching of public peace. The S.M.P. confiscated all copies of the seditious literature at the Hindustan Association which was located in the Rue du Consulat of the French Concession.

"... outwardly [Buddha Singh] seems to love his people, but inwardly, he is against them and on the side of the government".

— Harbaksh Singh, Hind Jagawa (1923), One Who Seeks the Blood of His Brethren for His Own Personal Benefit

The Ghadarites devised a plan to assassinate Buddha Singh. The Ghadarites wanted to murder Buddha in-order to throw the Sikh police unit in disarray and also to support the Chinese nationalist movement. On the morning of 6 April 1927, Buddha Singh was assassinated by being shot whilst he was in front of the gate of the Central Police Station located within the Shanghai International Settlement. His assassin was Harbant Singh, a Ghadar party member.

In the aftermath of Buddha Singh's murder, the British had nearly all prominent Ghadarites in custody within 2 months of the event. Additionally, the British increased the salaries and living conditions of Shanghai's Sikhs. According to Cin Yao, the murder of Buddha Singh helped kickstart British surveillance activities in the late 1920s and early 1930s to prevent revolutionary Sikhs and Indians from North America to travel to India through a Southeast and East Asian route.

=== People's Republic of China (1949–present) ===
After the advent of Communist rule in 1949, many Sikhs who had been employed as watchmen in China left the mainland and departed for resettlement in Hong Kong, immigrated to the West, or returned to India. Dozens of copies of the central Sikh scripture, the Guru Granth Sahib, were brought from China to India by these returning Sikhs rather than being left behind in China. However, it is said that around 260 Sikhs (most of them married to Chinese women) still remained in Shanghai afterwards. Many Sikh men had settled permanently in China by this time and had married local Chinese women, bearing mixed offspring. After 1949, the Chinese increasingly began to view Sikhs as an "undisciplined community" and "hated enemy". Despite this, some Sikhs opted to remain in Shanghai and remained there throughout the 1950s. In 1963, there were around 27 Sikhs in the city of Shanghai and most of them were engaged in the dairy industry.

During the Cultural Revolution, three gurdwaras' presidents and compounds were apprehended by Chinese authorities and no form of compensation was given to the remaining Sikhs. The Tientsin gurdwara was heavily vandalized and desecrated in September 1966 during the Cultural Revolution. On 16 September 1966, Shankar Rao, then the first secretary of the Indian embassy in Beijing, visited the Tientsin Sikh temple and found it in a deplorable state due to damage caused by Chinese nationals, some of whom were seen by eyewitnesses as wearing red arm-bands. The windows of the gurdwara were smashed, images of Indic deities were ripped apart, a painting of Guru Nanak was missing, and the Guru Granth Sahib of the temple was torn apart with its pages left strewn around the room. The wooden platform where the Sikh scripture was placed upon was damaged and the mattress of the same platform was ripped. Shankar Rao presented a page of the desecrated Guru Granth Sahib and torn image of the deity Hanuman as evidence for the defilement of the Tientsin Sikh temple in a meeting with the Chinese deputy section chief of the consular department on 19 September 1966. The Indian embassy officials requested that the Chinese government extend protection to the Tientsin Sikh gurdwara to ward off similar attacks in the future, to investigate the attack to bring its perpetrators to justice, and to compensate for the damages caused to the site. However, the Chinese government rejected this request and the evidence provided. Furthermore, they rejected that any damage had been inflicted on the Tientsin Sikh temple. According to the Chinese government's narrative, the Red Guards simply requested that the caretaker of the Tientsin Sikh temple remove the sign-board and photograph within the temple. This explanation was rejected by the Indian embassy due to the physical evidence contrary-wise at the scene of the incident. To the surprise of the Indian embassy, the Chinese government defended the attack on the Tientsin Sikh temple, lauding it as a "just and proper" action, "revolutionary", and that there was nothing to complain about and that the protest by the Indian embassy was "unjust".

Most of the remaining Sikhs left Shanghai in 1973 after the Sino-Indian War in 1962, these fleeing Shanghai Sikhs shifted to Hong Kong. In 1973, there were two Sikhs remaining in Shanghai: Gurmukh Singh and Kapul Singh, both of whom were dairy business owners. Gurmukh was using a room in the former Dong Baoxing Gurdwara as a place of residence and remarked that he had grown weary of feeling isolated. Gurmukh and Kapul left China by embarking for India from Hong Kong. Three or four Chinese women who had been married to Indian nationals and their mixed-race children had to be left behind because the Chinese government considered the wives and children to be Chinese citizens.

==== Current status ====
The majority of the Sikh population residing in China today can be found in eastern China, specifically the areas of Shanghai, Shaoxing and Yiwu. The current population of Sikhs in China is unknown, however United Sikhs estimated in a 2012–2013 report that the Sikh population in mainland China was around 7,500 and the population in Hong Kong as around 10,000, giving a total figure of 17,500 Sikhs in all of China. According to a United Sikhs report from 2012 to 2013, there are presently around 50 Sikhs residing in modern Shanghai. It also reported that there are around 10 Sikh families living in Shaoxing. The report claims that around 120 Sikhs reside in Yiwu. Sikhism is not an officially recognized religion by the Chinese government.

Sikhs began to return to Shanghai after a policy change which opened up the city to international exchanges. The Sikh presence in Shanghai is a shell of its historical self but is slowly rebuilding due to business enterprises. Most Sikhs in Shanghai today are working in technology-related sectors. Many Sikhs residing in China today are on a Z-class work visa. Apart from mainland China, many Sikh businessmen and Indians also reside in Hong Kong.

A secret gurdwara is maintained on the top-floor of a luxurious, private residence located in an affluent neighbourhood on the outskirts of Shanghai. It was established in around 2006 by a Sikh businessman. Regular religious service and caretaking of the gurdwara is carried out by a full-time granthi. Daily kirtan is performed in the morning and evening. Every Sunday, around 30 people attend services at the site. During Gurpurab celebrations, around 100 people visit the gurdwara, including Sindhis and Hindus. Only members of the local Sikh and Indian community are aware of the gurdwara and its existence is kept hidden from the Chinese government to avoid trouble. The caretakers of the secret gurdwara state that they have yet to obtain permission from the Chinese government to carry out religious services. After gathering enough funds, the local community is planning to obtain a permit from the Chinese government to legitimize the establishment of a gurdwara building for the community's religious needs. Practitioners of religions that do not have official recognition by the Chinese government face hurdles in the setting up of official, permanent religious institutions. Religious personnel appointments, religious publications, and seminary applications require Chinese government approval. However, in 2017 The Times of India reported on the gurdwara and that it was founded by Satbir Singh, whose family has been living and working in Hong Kong and Shanghai for decades. It was reported that relations between the local Chinese and Sikh residents are warm and friendly and that many Chinese friends of the Sikh congregates visit the gurdwara alongside them. Negative events between the relations of India and China do not effect the relationship between the Sikhs and local Chinese. There are closely forged bonds between the Sikh and Hindu communities in modern Shanghai.

One of the only official gurdwaras remaining in mainland China that is still functioning and carrying out its original purpose is a gurdwara located in Yiwu. There is a Sikh gurdwara located in Keqiao which is beside a Hindu temple, with both sites being maintained by a Hindu priest. The name of the gurdwara in Keqiao is Sach Dham and was it established in October 2011. Many of the attendees of the Keqiao gurdwara are ethnic Sindhi followers of Guru Nanak. The granthi of the Keqiao Sikh temple is recorded as complaining about the low amount of attendees and how visitors would spend minimal time in the temple premises. Hong Kong's gurdwaras still function normally.

According to Ka-Kin Cheuk, whilst the modern gurdwaras of Hong Kong and Shanghai show strong communal and social bonds, the gurdwara at Keqiao does not show the same social bonding between the congregates. He explains this by claiming this is due to how the Keqiao temple is mostly attended by Sindhis, who have not formed "one coherent community".

There are some ethnic Chinese in Shanghai whom are practitioners of Sikh-influenced kundalini yoga. Kundalini yoga started making inroads amongst some Chinese of Shanghai from 2010 onwards. The kundalini yoga practiced in the city was developed by a Sikh and incorporates Sikh philosophy and chanting elements. However, many Chinese practitioners of this Sikh brand of kundalini yoga reject the chanting practices. They believe that practicing kundalini is good for energy and strengthening the nervous system. A Taiwanese woman in the city, who practices kundalini yoga and runs a yoga studio, does so by wearing a turban and believes it protects her from headaches. Another woman of Chinese origin in the city, named Irina, also practices and teaches kundalini yoga and wears a turban and gown, both white in-colour.

In the 2000s, Chinese manufacturing of kirpans nearly wiped-out local Sikh manufacturers of the article of faith in India. Some statues of Guru Nanak manufactured in China during that time depict him with a more East Asian-akin phenotype and like a lama. Over the years since the 1990s, the Amritsari kirpan-manufacturing industry, mostly located in Sultanwind Gate, Kulfi Wali Gali, Sultanwind, East Mohan Nagar, Dana Mandi, and 100 Feet Road, reduced from hundreds of manufacturing-units to thirty or four due to competition with cheaper, fast-produced, Chinese-manufactured kirpans created in bulk, as opposed to the slow and manually-crafted Amritsari kirpans, which may be higher-quality but more expensive and numerically lesser due to their slow manufacturing time.

In 2019, it was reported that the Chinese government banned Sikhs from wearing turbans when obtaining identification documents (drivers' licences, visas, etc.) and they face questions from Chinese officials on their beards. Sikhs are often forced to remove their turbans and patkas when being photographed, such as to obtain mobile SIM cards. Sikhs who refuse to remove their religious head garbs are denied access to services. In the past, the Chinese government did not pressure Sikhs to remove their headwear in this manner. It was reported that a Sikh driving his vehicle in China was stopped by the police. The Chinese police told the Sikh that in-order to live in China, he has to shave-off his beard and remove his turban. Sikhs residing in China petitioned the Indian consulate in Shanghai to bring the matter up with their Chinese counterparts through diplomatic channels but nothing was done.

== Gurdwara ==
=== Extant gurdwaras ===
There are a small number of gurdwara (Sikh temples) in China:

- Gurdwara Shanghai, Shanghai – construction starting in 1907 on Dong Baoxing Road on land allotted by the Shanghai Municipal Council. It is now a residential complex and clinic and no longer a functioning Sikh temple.
- Khalsa Diwan Sikh Temple, Hong Kong – remains functional
- A gurdwara is located in Yiwu
- Gurdwara Sach Dham is located Keqiao – maintained by a Hindu priest and catering to a tiny, mostly ethnic Sindhi, congregation.
- A secret gurdwara is maintained on the top-floor of a luxurious, private residence located in an affluent neighbourhood on the outskirts of Shanghai. It was established by Satbir Singh and his family. It is located in a luxurious villa in Hongqiao.
- A gurdwara is reported to be on Jinhui Road South in Shanghai.
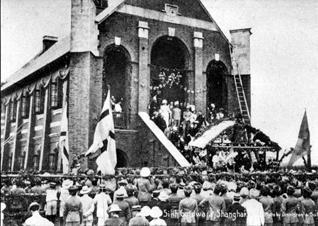
Inauguration in 1908 of Sikh Gurdwara in Shanghai

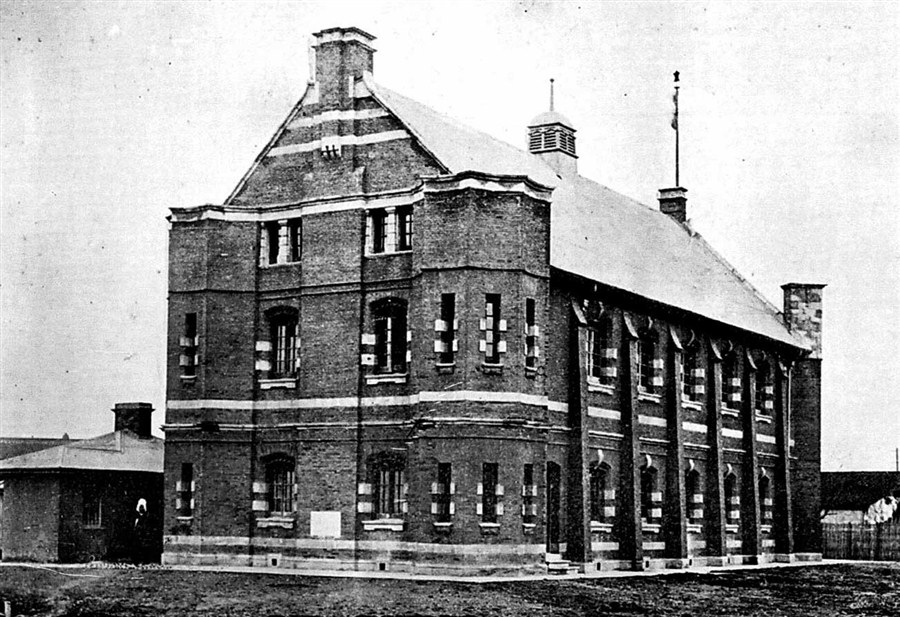
Picture of Old Sikh Gurdwara in Shanghai which is used for residential purpose now

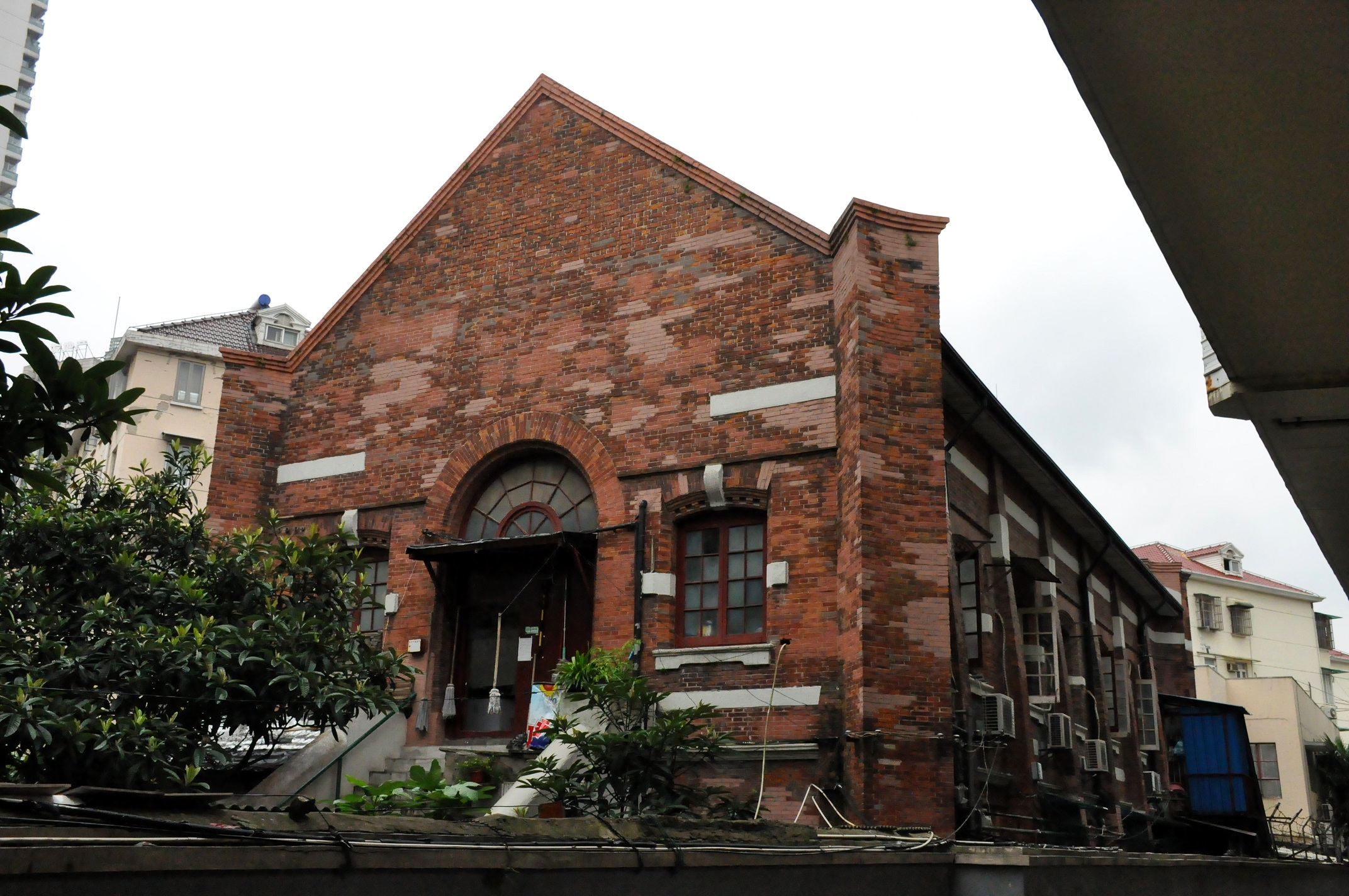
Bauxing Road Gurdwara Monument for Sikhism heritage in China

=== Lost gurdwaras ===
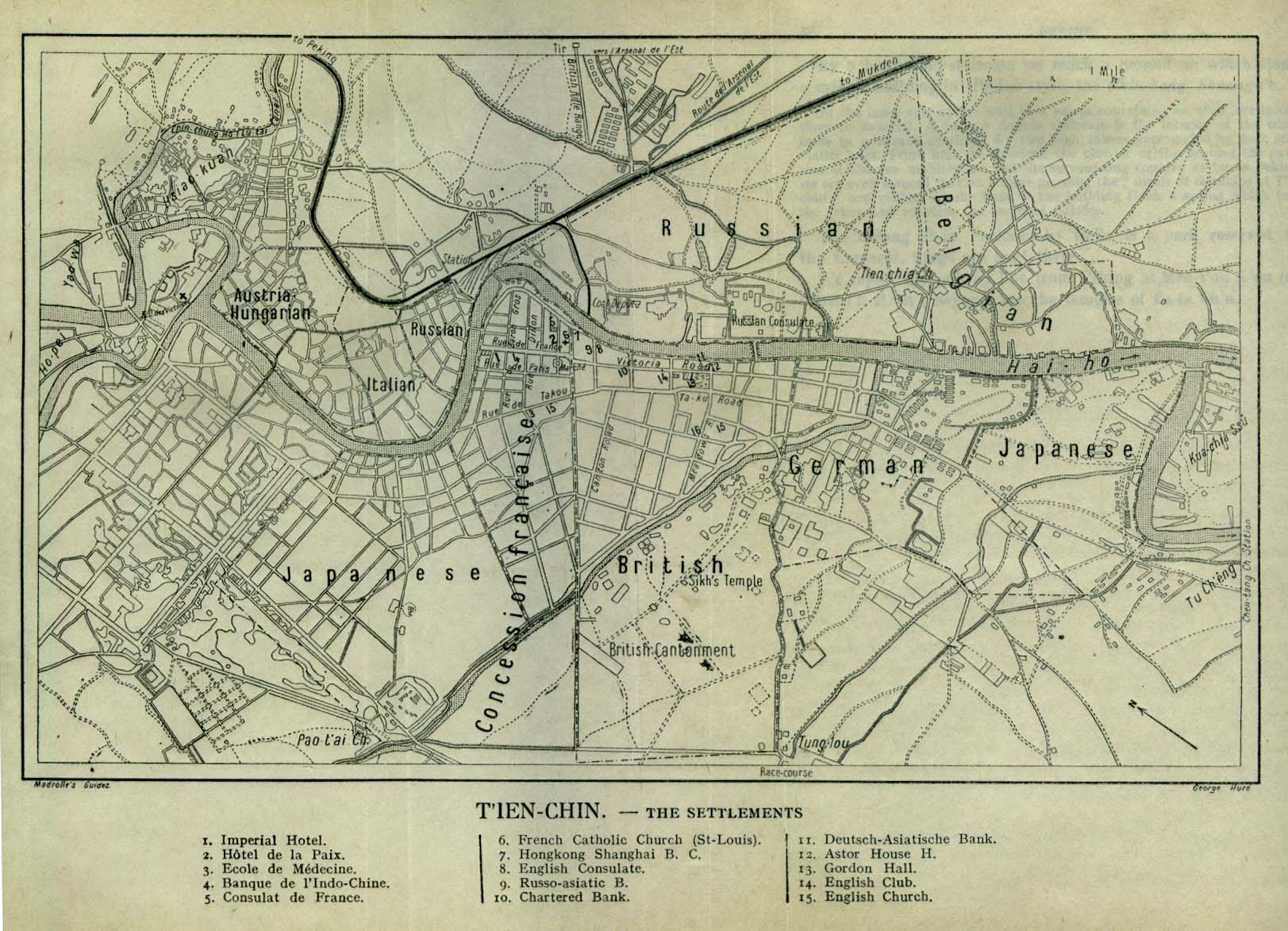
Tientsin map from ca.1912 identifying the location of a Sikh temple in the city. The temple is now lost.

By the 1930s, aside from the Shanghai Gurdwara, there apparently were two more gurdwaras located in the city of Shanghai. However, Swarn Singh Kahlon was unable to authenticate their location, fate, or even existence, when he investigated. Aside from Shanghai, there were other gurdwaras which had been established in Tientsin and Hankou.

Specific details are as follows:

- Gordon Road Gurdwara, Shanghai – a former gurdwara that was located on Gordon Road (today's Jiangning Road) which was meant only for Sikh policemen. The architect who designed the gurdwara was R. C. Turner, who had earlier designed the Dong Baoxing Road Gurdwara. It was inaugurated and opened on Friday, 21 July 1916. Motivations behind its establishment may be related to the British wanting to keep closer surveillance of Sikh policemen to prevent revolutionary activities from festering like what had occurred at the gurdwara on Dong Baoxing Road. Compared to the earlier Dong Baoxing Road Gurdwara, the Gordon Road Gurdwara was much larger, had a library, cookhouse, granthi quarters, and a committee room. It had enough room for 500 parishioners. The gurdwara in the present-day is hidden behind a building material's market. It is in a precarious state, with its current condition being described as "full of rubbish dumps, waste water flowing, flies and mosquitoes, and a terrible smell".
- There was a gurdwara located on No.218 Chusan Road (now Zhoushan Road/Zhoushan Lu) in a neighbourhood of Shanghai's Hongkou district. The structure is a three-story building that does not bear resemblance to other buildings in its vicinity. This gurdwara was used as a place of residence for Jewish refugees during World War II. Maharaja Jagatjit Singh of Kapurthala State was photographed visiting the vicinity of this area in the 1930s.
- A gurdwara existed in Tientsin. Its construction cost was assisted by a donation made by Jagajit Singh of Kapurthala in 1903–04. The Tientin gurdwara was heavily vandalized in September 1966 during the Cultural Revolution.
- A gurdwara existed in Hankou.
- A gurdwara existed on Boone Road (today's Tanggu Road) in Shanghai, prior to 1908. In 1904, a large and decorated volume of the Guru Granth Sahib was delivered to this gurdwara. The secretary of the gurdwara was B. Tek Singh.

== Tibetans and Sikhism ==
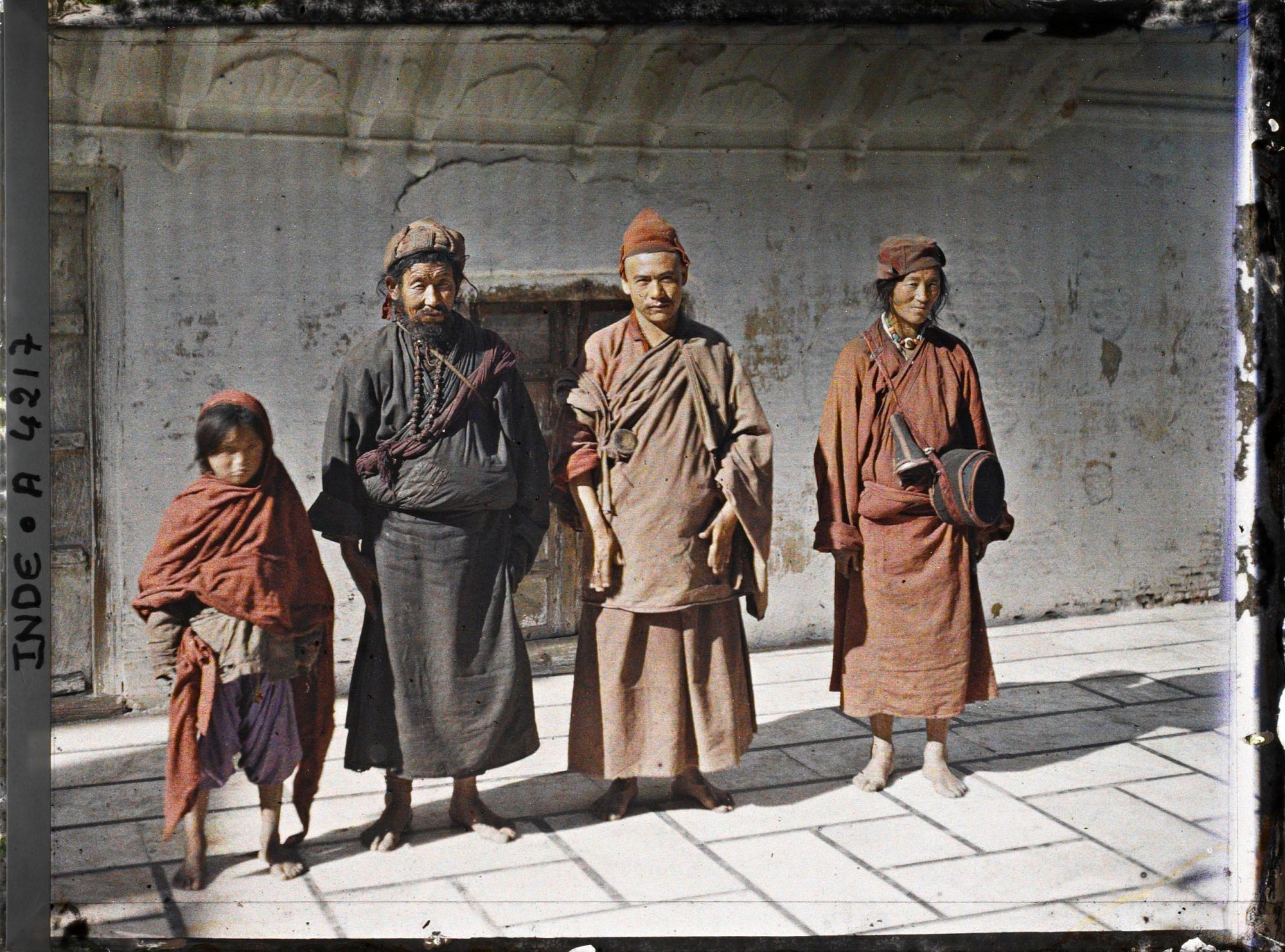
True-colour photograph – "Group of Tibetans at the 'Golden Temple' of the Sikhs", 15 January 1914

Trilochan Singh claims that, for centuries, Tibetans have been making pilgrimages to the Golden Temple shrine in Amritsar to pay homage to Guru Nanak's memory. However, Tibetans seem to have confused Nanak with the visit of Padmasambhava centuries earlier, and have superimposed details of Padmasambhava onto Nanak out of reverence (believing the essence of both figures is one and the same) or mistaken chronology. (Note: Padmasambhava is alternatively known as 'Guru Rinpoche'.) According to Tibetan scholar Tarthang Tulku, many Tibetans believe Guru Nanak was an incarnation of Padmasambhava. Both Buddhist and Bon Tibetans made pilgrimages to the Golden Temple in Amritsar, however they revered the site for different reasons.

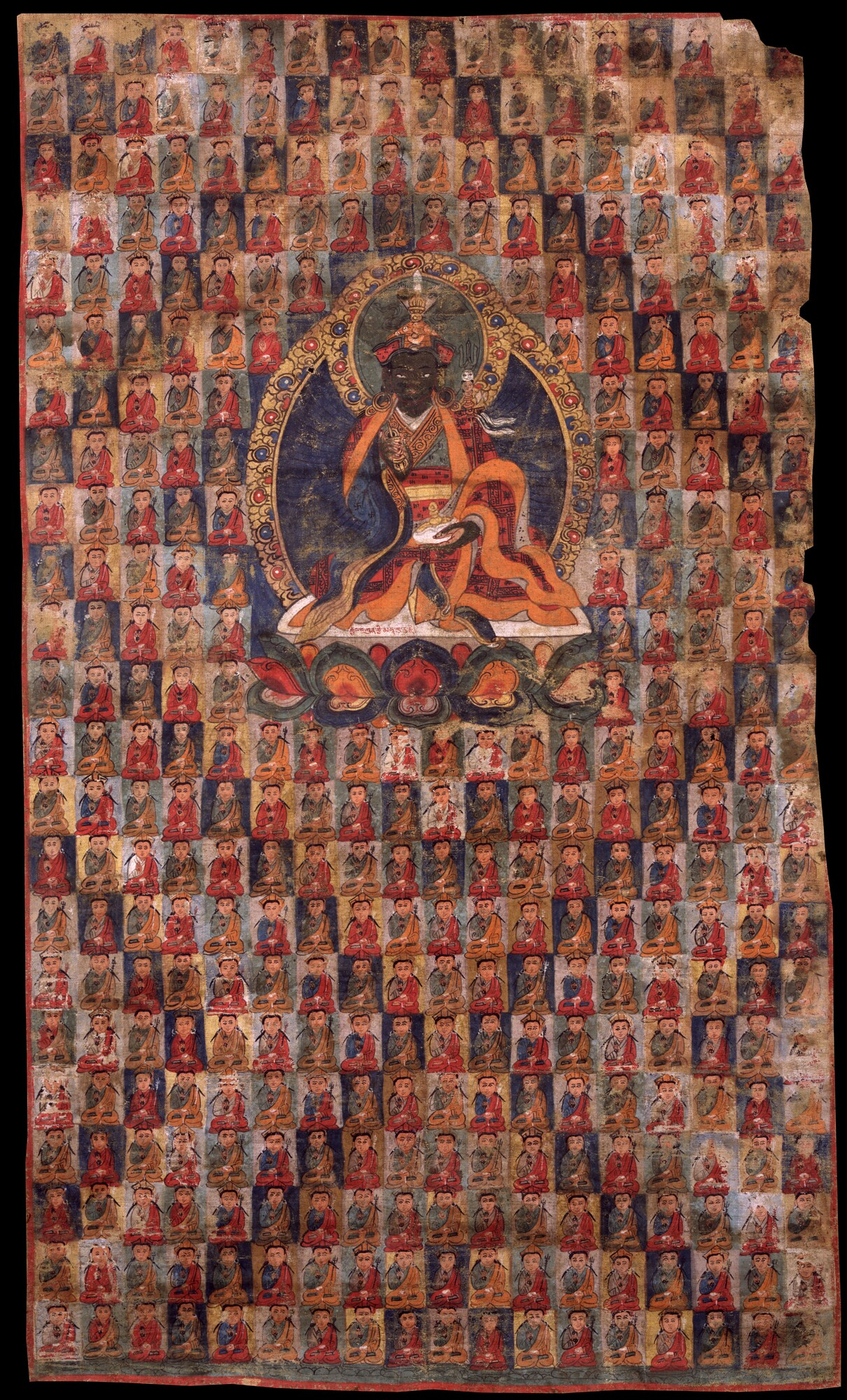
Painting of a dark-complexioned Padmasambhava surrounded by 356 smaller depictions of various forms of Padmasambhava, from eastern Tibet, circa 17th century.

Between 1930 and 1935, the Tibetan spiritual leader, Khyungtrül Rinpoche (Khyung-sprul Rinpoche), travelled to India for a second time, visiting the Golden Temple in Amritsar during this visit. Whilst visiting Amritsar in 1930 or 1931, Khyung-sprul and his Tibetan entourage walked around the Golden Temple while making offerings. Khyung-sprul referred to the Golden Temple as "Guru Nanak's Palace" (Tibetan: Guru Na-nig-gi pho-brang). Khyung-sprul returned to the Golden Temple in Amritsar for another time during his third and final visit to India in 1948.

Several years later after the 1930–31 visit of Khyung-sprul, a Tibetan Bonpo monk by the name of Kyangtsün Sherab Namgyel (rKyang-btsun Shes-rab-rnam rgyal) visited the Golden Temple at Amritsar and offered the following description:

"Their principal gshen is the Subduing gshen with the 'bird-horns'. His secret name is Guru Nanak. His teachings were the Bon of Relative and Absolute Truth. He holds in his hand the Sword of Wisdom ... At this holy place the oceanic assembly of the tutelary gods and buddhas ... gather like clouds"

— Kyangtsün Sherab Namgyel

Kyangtsün Sherab Namgyel conflated the essence of Sikhism with the "sphere of the supreme Bon" and believed the Golden Temple in Amritsar was "a citadel for the life-force of the eternal [Bon] tantras". He referred to Amritsar as "Gyakhar Bachö" (rGya mkhar ba chod) due to the similarities of Sikhs (beards and turbans) to descriptions of ancient Bonpos. He refers to the Sikh turbans as "bird horns" (bya ru), which is believed to be a unique feature of the eighteen kings of Zhangzhung and early Bonpo priests.

Another Tibetan, Dzamyag, identifies the Golden Temple as the most sacred shrine of Sikhism but believed it held sacred objects connected to Padmasambhava and his consort Mandāravā:

We visited some ornaments [kept] in a shrine [and] said to be, according to the tradition, the body ornaments of princess Mandāravā, and, in [another] shrine [we saw] the ritual objects said to be those of Guru Rinpoche.

— translated by Lucia Galli, Kha stag ʼDzam yag (1997), page 146

According to some Tibetans, the sarovar of the Golden Temple in Amritsar was linked to the lake of Padmasambhava.

== Popular culture ==
There are many depictions and portrayals of Sikhs in media where the setting is Shanghai during its treaty-port era.

Caricatures and newspaper cartoons of prototypical Shanghai Sikh policemen were often drawn by both Chinese and European artists.

The Adventures of Tintin contains many depictions and references to Sikhs of Shanghai during the colonial-period. In The Blue Lotus of the fifth volume of 'The Adventures of Tintin', set in 1931, Shanghai-based Sikh policemen play a role in the story. Sikhs are depicted directing traffic and also Sikhs are ordered to punish Tintin in the municipal jail.

In Kazuo Ishiguro's 2000 book, When We Were Orphans, Sikh policemen are described as stacking sandbags during the 1937 Japanese aggression against Shanghai.

In Bruce Lee's film Jing Wu Men (Fist of Fury) (1972), Bruce Lee attacks a Sikh guard who bars him from entering the Shanghai Public Gardens.

Memoirs and popular histories authored by former British Shanghailanders contain stereotypes of Shanghai's Sikhs. One written by former policeman Daniel Cormie states that the Sikh policemen of Shanghai possessed the disposition of ten-year-old children due to them being "happy, carefree and entirely uninhibited".

Within China today, Sikhs of the era are depicted in a negative manner for political reasons as an enemy oppressing the Chinese people on behalf of their British overlords. A painting titled Xueji ('Blood Sacrifice') by Ma Hongdao depicts the Nanjing Road Incident of 1925 in a manner where only Sikh policemen are solely depicted as firing on the Chinese protesters, completely ignoring the fact that ethnic Chinese policemen also were present at the actual historical event and partook in the shooting.

Sikhs are commonly featured in the Shanghai City Museum's exhibitions. The Shanghai Public Security Museum on 518 Ruijin Road South contains a life-size wax statue of a Sikh policeman near the entranceway on the ground floor. On other floors of the museum, there are sepia-stained photographs of Sikh traffic police at-work.

According to Cao Yin, Sikhs feature as voiceless backdrops in many films and novels on colonial-era Shanghai, being delegated to the sidelines as part of an orientalist view of the city. They do not feature as main characters but only part of the background setting, merely as objects to exoticize the historical setting of the Shanghai International Settlement, standing silently wearing red-turbans, comparable to trees on the side of the road. This manner of portrayal ignores the efforts that the Sikh community made to modernize the city of Shanghai.

== See also ==
- Sikhism in Hong Kong
- Sikhism in South Korea
- Sikhism in Japan
