= International Institute for Astronautical Sciences =

Higher education institution devoted to space exploration and science literacy

- International Institute for Astronautical Sciences logo

- Location within the United States
- Abbreviation: IIAS
- Formation: 2015
- Type: Nonprofit
- Location: Boulder, Colorado
- Coordinates: 40.0185°N 105.2657°W
- Chairman, Board of Advisors: Winston E. Scott
- Advisor: Yvonne Cagle
- Executive Director: Jason Reimuller
- Website: astronauticsinstitute.org

The International Institute for Astronautical Sciences (IIAS) is a not-for-profit higher education institution devoted to research promoting space exploration, science literacy, and the peaceful uses of outer space. As of 2025 they offer opportunities for classroom-based and experiential education such as microgravity flight campaigns and pressure suit operations.

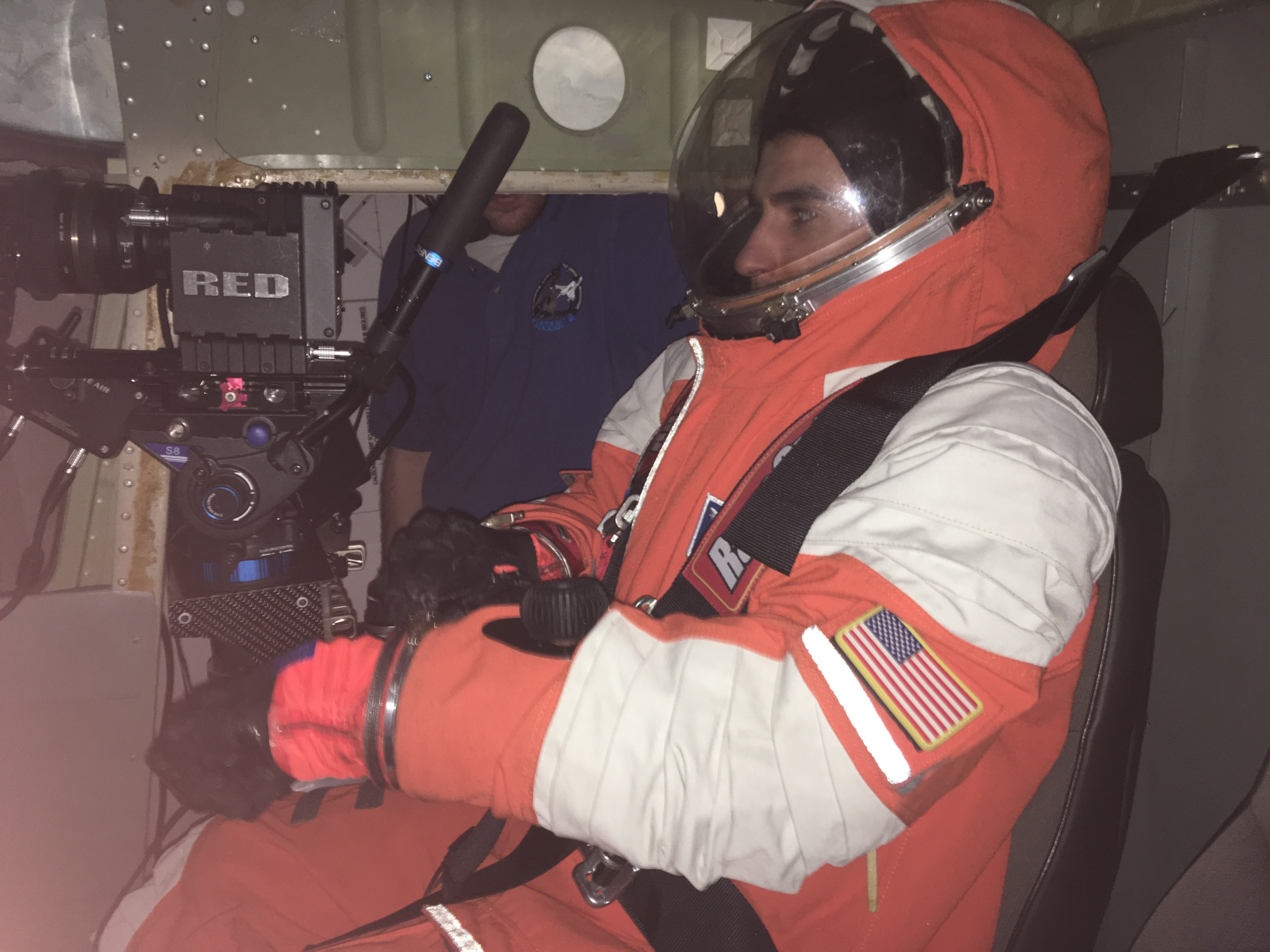
Student in intravehicular Final Frontier Design pressure suit used at IIAS in Daytona Beach Florida during aeronomy training flight

== History ==
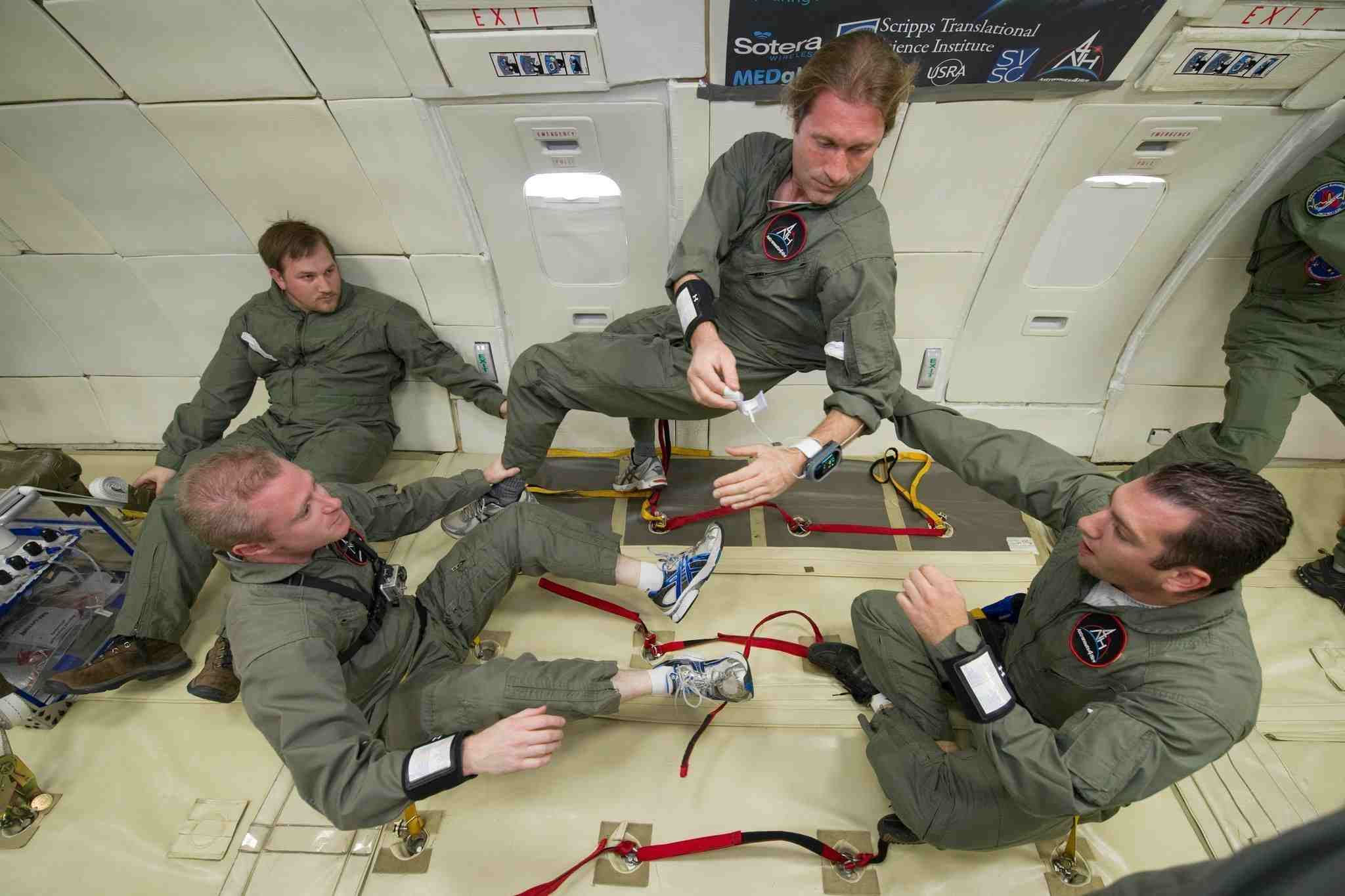
Microgravity campaign flight with the Association of Spaceflight Professionals, IIAS director Jason Reimuller at the center

The flagship program of the organization was Project PoSSUM, short for Polar Suborbital Science in the Upper Mesosphere. PoSSUM's Aeronomy Program grew from an opportunity created by the Noctilucent Cloud Imagery and Tomography Experiment, selected by the NASA Flight Opportunities Program as Experiment 46-S in March 2012.

The International Institute for Astronautical Sciences (IIAS) was founded in 2015.

In 2016, the organization partnered with the Space Foundation to operate their education program at the Colorado Discovery Center. The program was designed by upper atmospheric scientists and former NASA astronaut instructors as an immersive education program for high-school and undergraduate students.

By 2017, classes were offered in Daytona Beach, Florida at the Embry Riddle Aeronautical University Campus. Students received comprehensive training in Final Frontier Designs IVA pressure suits, mission simulation training, high-altitude and hypoxia awareness training, and aerospace physiology training in aerobatic flight conditions. Contributing to PoSSUM at this time were retired NASA astronauts Winston Scott, Nicole Stott, and world-champion aerobatic pilot Patty Wagstaff.

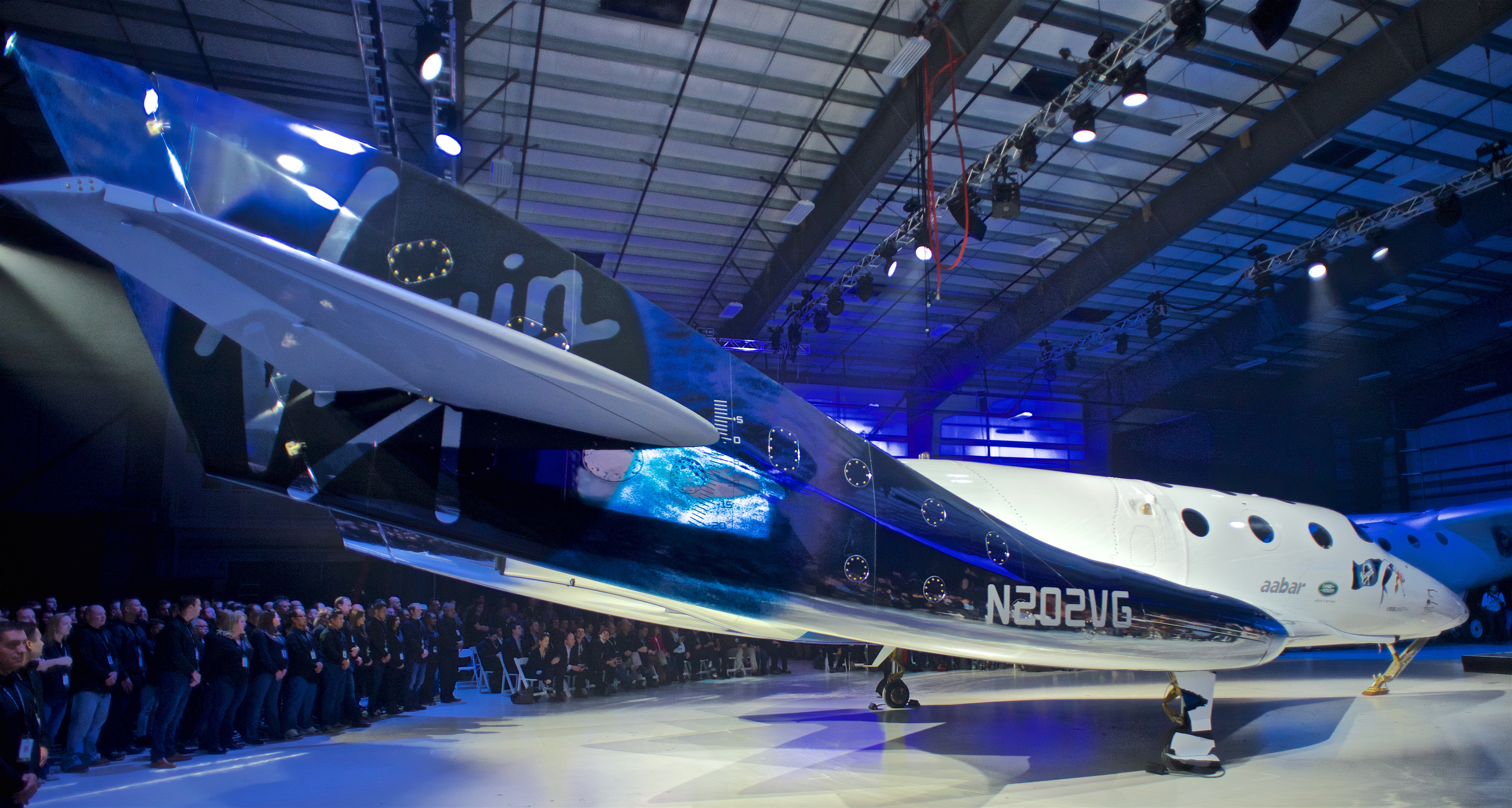
Virgin Galactic Space Ship Unity, used for IIAS first mission campaign flight Galactic 05 in 2023

On May 21, 2025, IIAS was authorized by the Connecticut Office of Higher Education and through Connecticut State Bill 1424 to confer degrees and certificates.

== Description ==
IIAS is a 501(c)(3) organization, yielding publications in aeronomy, bioastronautics, human factors, and educational methods mostly through private funding.

They offer a single thesis-based Masters of Science degree in Astronautical Science for 30 credits. It also offeres confer licensed postbaccalaureate and undergraduate certificates in bioastronautics and space flight operations, along with postbaccalaureate certificates in flight test engineering and space environment. Additionally, students are able to study post-baccalaureate programs in microgravity science, space medicine, space suit evaluation, and operational science, through partnerships with the National Research Council of Canada, Florida Tech, Survival Systems USA, NAUI, and the Canadian Space Agency. IIAS combines distance education with on-site intensives at satellite locations in Groton, Connecticut and Melbourne, Florida in the U.S. and in Ottawa, Ontario, Canada.

== Spaceflight missions ==
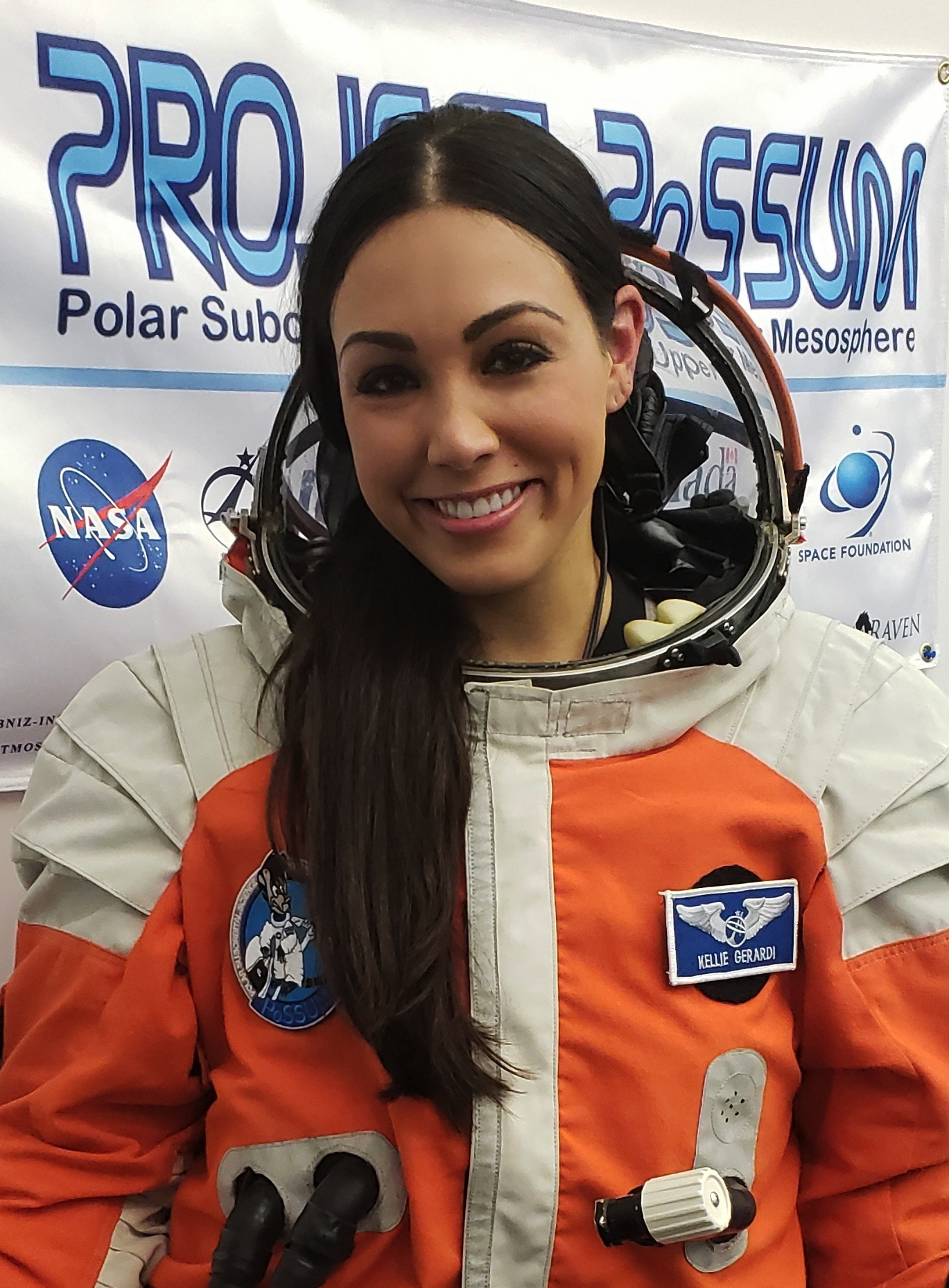
Virgin Galactic astronaut Kellie Gerardi during training with IIAS

In November 2023, Kellie Gerardi had three IIAS-sponsored projects onboard a Virgin Galactic suborbital flight. VSS Unity was used for IIAS first mission campaign flight. Gerardi examined how fluids behaved in low gravity to help inform designs for future medical technologies and life-support systems.

In 2024, Virgin Galactic announced an IIAS reserved flight for three of their researchers aboard the Delta spaceship. These researchers include Kellie Gerardi, Shawna Pandya, and Norah Patten.

== Notable program attendees ==
- IIAS Director of Human Spaceflight Operations and Virgin Galactic astronaut Kellie Gerardi
- Youngest program student, Alyssa Carson
- Cardiologist and Blue Origin astronaut, Eiman Jahangir
- Civil rights activist and Blue Origin astronaut, Amanda Nguyen, who as of 2024 was work as a bioastronautics researcher at IIAS

== Social impact ==
Outside of IIAS educational programs and research, the organization has supported initiatives such as Out Astronaut and Space for All Nations.
