= Karman Project =

Global fellowship program for space industry leaders

- Industry: Space leadership and governance
- Founded: 2019; 7 years ago
- Founder: Ke Wang; Hannah Ashford; Artur Koop
- Headquarters: Berlin, Germany
- Website: www.karmanproject.org

The Karman Project is a global one-year fellowship program for leaders in the space industry, founded in 2020. The organization is based in Berlin, Germany.

== Description ==
The Karman Project is designed to foster trust, independent dialogue, cooperation, and diplomacy among their fellows. Fifteen leaders in the space industry aged 15 to 45, who have achieved outstanding professional accomplishments in space, are selected each year from some of the most impactful space organizations and companies in the world.

The organization itself is a nonprofit, independent, with global headquarters in Berlin, Germany. The Karman Project has partnered with the Oxford Space Initiative at Saïd Business School to strengthen the relationships between committed individuals coming from the research, business, venture, government, and industry sectors.

As of 2025, Jean-Jacques Dordain, former director-general of the European Space Agency, heads the board of the Karman Project.

== History ==
The Karman Project was founded in 2020 by Ke Wang, Hannah Ashford, and Artur Koop.

The annual fellowship was hosted in Dubai, UAE in 2021, and in Normandy, France, in 2022.

The Maldives Space Research Organization hosted Karman in Malé, with the Hithadhoo School and Six Senses Laamu in 2023. In 2024 it was hosted in Bulgaria by EnduroSat.

In June 2025, Karman announced the world's first cultural payload to the International Space Station, sending seeds to space of culturally important crops. These included:

- Egyptian cotton
- Armenian pomegranate
- Nigerian egusi melon
- Pakistani wheat

In October 2025, Karman launched the Space Peace Prize, to champion critical peace efforts in the space domain. In the same year, the annual fellowship week was hosted in Bangalore, India.

== Fellows ==
Every year up to 15 fellows are selected to participate in the program, with an additional runner-up class denoted as Karman Pioneers. Many of the fellows have notable histories, which lends to their selection and leadership development within the industry. The following table lists the Karman Fellows by year.

| Name | Fellowship Year | Country |
|---|---|---|
| Chris Boshuizen | 2020 | USA/Australia |
| Christopher Richins | 2020 | USA |
| Fabien Jordan | 2020 | Switzerland |
| Feng Young | 2020 | China |
| Katherine Bennell-Pegg | 2020 | Australia |
| Lynette Tan | 2020 | Singapore |
| Marc Marzenit | 2020 | Spain |
| Prateep Basu | 2020 | India |
| Rafal Modrzewski | 2020 | Poland/Finland |
| Rogel Mari Sese | 2020 | Philippines |
| Thomas Pesquet | 2020 | France |
| Temidayo Isaiah Oniosun | 2020 | Nigeria |
| Tom Segert | 2020 | Germany |
| Yoav Landsman | 2020 | Israel |
| Pierre Bertrand | 2021 | France |
| Jingqi Cai | 2021 | China |
| Vanessa Clark | 2021 | USA/Australia |
| Davis Cook | 2021 | South Africa |
| Priyanka D. Rajkakati | 2021 | India/France |
| Clarisse Iribagiza | 2021 | Rwanda |
| Joe Laurienti | 2021 | USA |
| Jessica Meir | 2021 | USA/Sweden |
| Alessandro Golkar | 2021 | Italy |
| Jonathan Hofeller | 2021 | USA |
| Thomas Oehl | 2021 | Germany |
| Yuanyuan Peng | 2021 | China |
| Nahum Romero | 2021 | Mexico |
| Neha Satak | 2021 | USA/India |
| So-yeon Yi | 2021 | Japan |
| Joseph Abakunda | 2022 | Rwanda |
| Siti Nur Aazzah Abdul Aziz | 2022 | Brunei |
| Hazzaa Al Mansoori | 2022 | UAE |
| Nelly Ben Hayoun-Stepanian | 2022 | France |
| Theresa Condor | 2022 | USA |
| David Dana | 2022 | France |
| Melania Guerra | 2022 | Costa Rica |
| Martin Langer | 2022 | Austria |
| Tricia Larose | 2022 | Canada |
| Mike Lindsay | 2022 | USA |
| Xin Liu | 2022 | China |
| Balachandar Ramamurthy | 2022 | USA |
| Erika Wagner | 2022 | USA |
| Grier Wilt | 2022 | USA |
| Dongkun Xia | 2022 | China |
| Norilmi Amilia Ismail | 2023 | Malaysia |
| Liang Chen | 2023 | China |
| Joan Chesoni | 2023 | Kenya |
| Emma Gatti | 2023 | Italy |
| Jacob Malthouse | 2023 | Canada |
| Raffaele Mauro | 2023 | Italy |
| Raycho Raychev | 2023 | Bulgaria |
| Sara Sabry | 2023 | Egypt |
| Barret Schlegelmilch | 2023 | USA |
| Jenni Sidey-Gibbons | 2023 | Canada |
| Anastasia Stepanova | 2023 | Russia |
| Mani Thiru | 2023 | Australia |
| Trent Tresch | 2023 | USA |
| Aoife Van Linden Tol | 2023 | Ireland |
| Luis Zea | 2023 | Guatemala |
| Abeer S. Al-Saud | 2024 | Talga/Saudi Arabia |
| Tuva Atasever | 2024 | Turkiye |
| Salah Eddine Bentata | 2024 | Algeria |
| Bianca Cefalo | 2024 | Italy/UK |
| Tao Chen | 2024 | China |
| Richelle Ellis | 2024 | USA |
| Olayinka Fagbemiro | 2024 | Nigeria |
| Aisha Jagirani | 2024 | Pakistan |
| Alena Kuzmenko | 2024 | Russia |
| Kavya K. Manyapu | 2024 | India/USA |
| Will Pomerantz | 2024 | USA |
| Lucie Poulet | 2024 | France |
| Manny Shar | 2024 | UK/Pakistan |
| Jake Thompson | 2024 | UK |
| Armen Askijian | 2025 | USA |
| Venkata Sai Kiran Chakravadhanula | 2025 | India |
| Ian Christensen | 2025 | USA |
| Mariam Fardous | 2025 | Saudi Arabia |
| Mohammad Iranmanesh | 2025 | Iran, Belgium |
| Fani Kallianou de Jong | 2025 | Greece |
| Kartik Kumar | 2025 | Netherlands |
| Lucie Low | 2025 | UK |
| Matthieu Lys | 2025 | France |
| Alexandre Mangeot | 2025 | France |
| Charles Mwangi | 2025 | Kenya |
| Shawna Pandya | 2025 | Canada |
| Andrew Ratcliffe | 2025 | UK |
| Minoo Rathnasabapathy | 2025 | Australia/South Africa |
| Amelie Schoenenwald | 2025 | Germany |
| Amal Albinali | 2026 | Bahrain |
| Meganne Christian | 2026 | UK |
| Gabriele de Canio | 2026 | Italy |
| Rosso Dieng | 2026 | Senegal |
| Lucas Fonseca | 2026 | Brazil |
| Julia Gottfriedsen | 2026 | Germany |
| Shuai Huang | 2026 | China |
| Eiman Jahangir | 2026 | USA |
| Gay Jane Perez | 2026 | Philippines |
| Ioana Petrescu | 2026 | Romania |
| Chris Sembroski | 2026 | USA |
| Masako Shiba | 2026 | USA |
| Shubbanshu Shukla | 2026 | India |
| Aleksandra Stankovic | 2026 | USA |
| Sheila Xu | 2026 | USA |
