= Shawna Pandya =

Indian-Canadian astronaut

Shawna Pandya is a Canadian medical doctor and space communicator. She is best known for her research with the International Institute of Astronautical Sciences and her planned 2026 suborbital flight to space with Virgin Galactic.

She is an aquanaut having worked on the NEP2NE project in 2019 and May 2023, spending a total of 11 days, 10 nights underwater. She has flown 12 parabolic flight campaigns, culminating over 180 parabolas of experience in micro- and reduced gravity. Pandya also pursues business opportunities related to space medicine.

== Spaceflight ==
Pandya is expected to fly on Virgin Galactic's Delta-class spacecraft with fellow researchers Kellie Gerardi from the United States and Norah Patten from Ireland in 2026.

== Awards and honors ==
- 2021 Women's Executive Network's Top 100 Most Powerful Women in Canada
- Karman Fellow 2025
- Explorers Club "50 Explorers Changing the World"

== Select publications ==
- Shirah, Bader; Mason, Christopher E.; Pandya, Shawna; Gonzalez, Yvette; Persad, Aaron H.; Ahmed, Mohammed M.; Ashemimry, Mishaal N.; Sen, Jon (1 January 2025). "Evaluation of astronaut experience, future directions, and recommendations for neuroscience research methods in human spaceflight". Neuroscience Research in Short-Duration Human Spaceflight. Academic Press. pp. 145–158. doi:10.1016/B978-0-443-33918-9.00001-8.
