= Alyssa Carson =

American space enthusiast (born 2001)

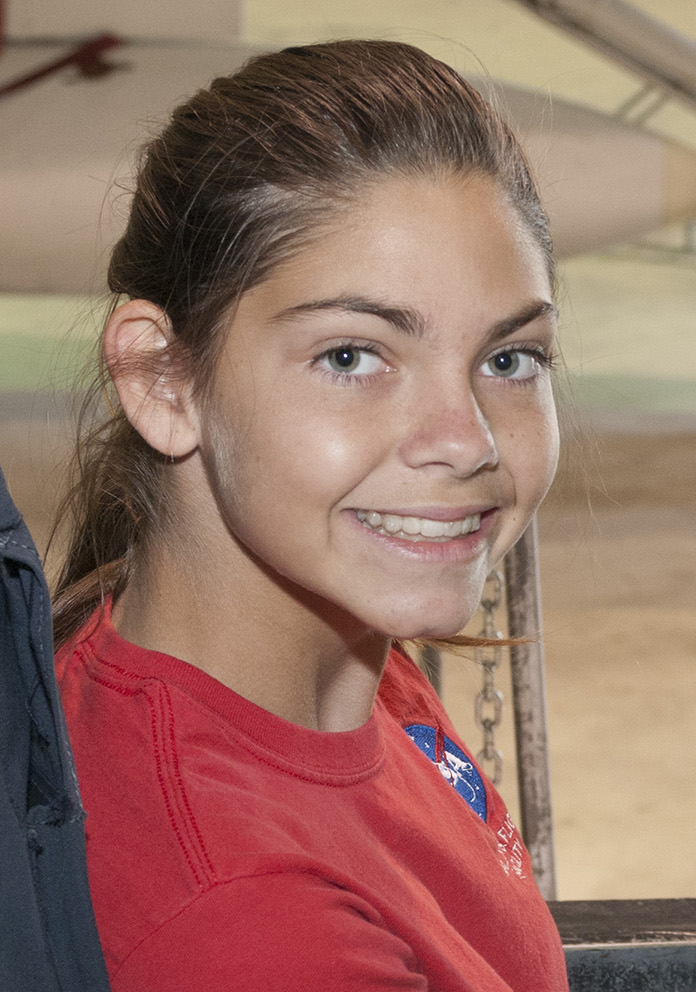
- Carson in 2015
- Born: March 10, 2001 (age 25); Hammond, Louisiana, U.S.
- Education: Florida Institute of Technology (BS); University of Arkansas
- Known for: Space enthusiasm
- Scientific career
- Fields: Biology
- Workplaces: University of Arkansas
- Doctoral advisor: Timothy Kral
- Website: nasablueberry.com

Alyssa Carson (born March 10, 2001) is an American social media influencer and space enthusiast known for her ambition from a young age to be the first person on Mars. She has attended numerous space camps and has visited every NASA visitor center. She uses the social media branding NASABlueberry, but NASA has publicly stated she is not affiliated with NASA or any space program.

== Early life and education ==
Alyssa Carson was born on March 10, 2001, in Hammond, Louisiana.

She graduated from Baton Rouge International School, a private school.

In 2023, she received her Bachelor of Science in astrobiology from the Florida Institute of Technology. While in undergraduate school she was a member of the Gamma Phi Beta sorority.

As of March 2024 she was a Doctor of Philosophy candidate at the University of Arkansas in the biology department under Timothy Kral. She taught several biology modules at the University of Arkansas between 2023 and 2025.

== Early interest in space ==
Carson attended her first space camp in Huntsville, Alabama, at age seven and went on to attend six more. She remains the only person to attend every NASA space camp offered including those in Turkey and Canada. The nickname Blueberry, referred to as a call sign, was selected at space camp.

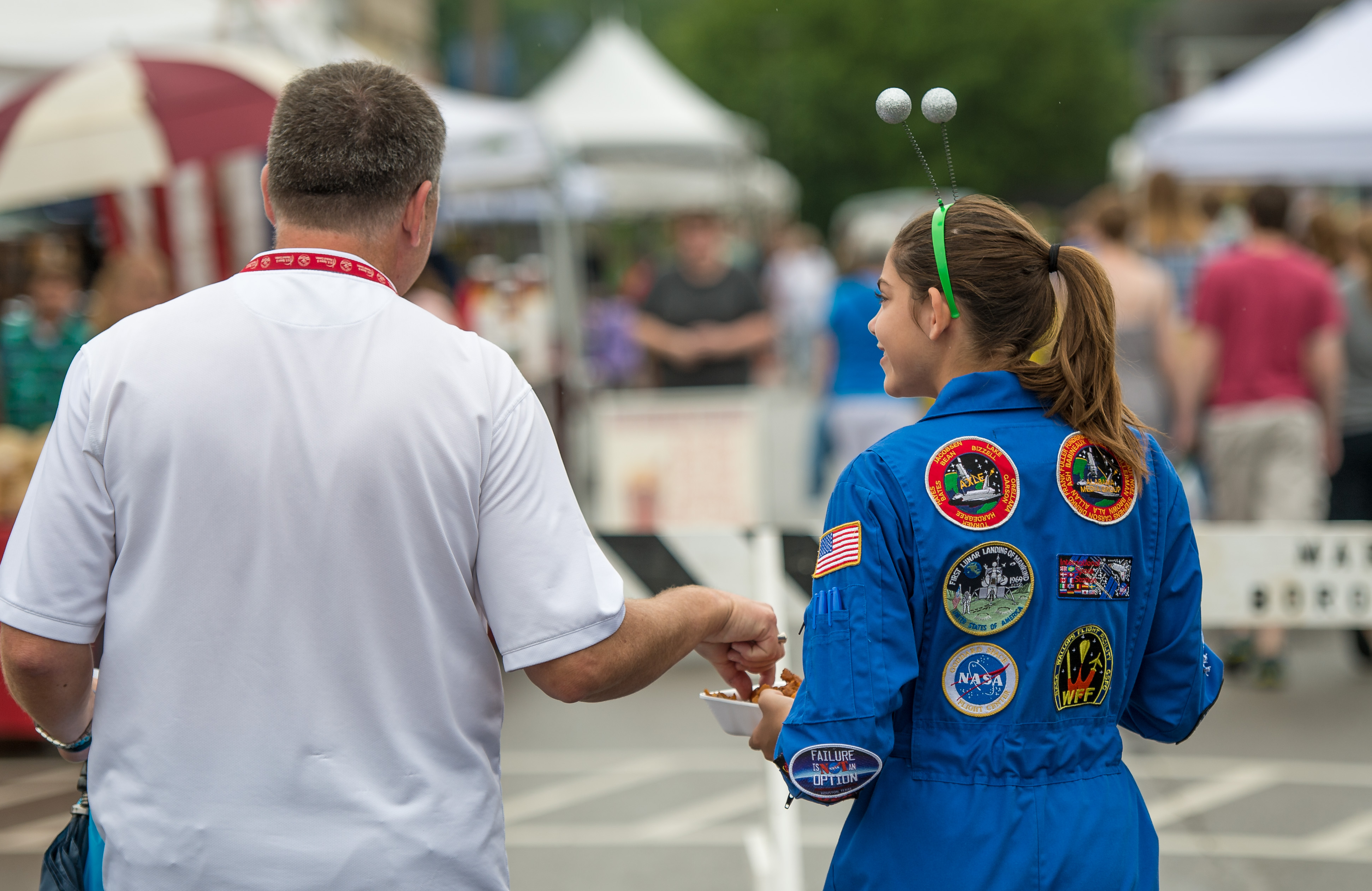
Mars New Year's Celebration

At 15, Carson became the youngest person to be selected to join the Advanced PoSSUM (Project Polar Suborbital Science in the Upper Mesosphere) Space Academy, a citizen science astronautics program developed by the International Institute for Astronautical Sciences for high school and college students at Embry–Riddle Aeronautical University.

At 18, Carson earned her pilot's license. Her training has also included water survival, g force training, micro gravity flights, obtaining scuba certification, and decompression training. She attended a Sally Ride Summer Camp at the Massachusetts Institute of Technology in Boston. She told Teen Vogue she always thought she would, "become an astronaut, go to Mars, come back, and then be a teacher or the president".

== Media and social influence ==
In 2013, Carson was the first person to complete the "NASA Passport Program," visiting each of NASA's fourteen visitor centers across nine states. She was then invited to be a panelist at the MER (Mars Exploration Rover) 10 Panel at the Smithsonian National Air and Space Museum in Washington, DC. She was featured by the BBC when she was 13 for her desire to be the first person on Mars. She was featured as the Youngest Female Groundbreaker on the Steve Harvey talk show. She was featured in the 2017 documentary The Mars Generation.

In 2019, Carson appeared on an episode of Ryan's Mystery Playdate. She is also frequently interviewed to discuss her childhood goal of becoming an astronaut and traveling to Mars. She has been involved with several space-related products, including "space luggage" designed by Horizn Studios, and participated in testing Final Frontier Design's spacesuit for the Canadian Space Agency headquarters. She promotes footwear for Nike and home appliances for SodaStream. She is a brand partner with Louis Vuitton, Bulgari, and Alpha Industries.

Carson self-published So, You Want to Be an Astronaut in 2018 and Ready for Liftoff: Becoming an Astronaut of the Mars Generation in 2022. She has written for The Independent.

Carson has a popular Instagram account and a large Twitter (X) following.

=== NASA and "astronaut in training" misinformation ===
While frequently described by the media as an "astronaut in training", Carson is not affiliated with any national space program. NASA has publicly stated that the organization "has no official ties to Alyssa Carson", and separately that "although Ms. Carson uses 'NASA' in her website name and Twitter and Instagram handles, we're not affiliated at all." In 2019 Newsweek corrected a headline that had implied that Carson's training was affiliated with NASA. Snopes also has dedicated a page to clarify such claims, which says: "Carson is not in training with—or being prepped by—NASA to become an astronaut, or to take part in the first human mission to Mars."

== Recognition and awards ==
In 2017, Carson was named one of nine Louisiana Young Heroes, an award given to exceptional high school students by Louisiana Public Broadcasting.

In 2019, she received the Louisiana State University Women's Center Esprit de Femme Award, and is the youngest recipient of the award to date.

She was honored by Louisiana Life magazine as a 2020 Louisianan of the Year in the science category.

In 2022, she received Florida Tech's Student Catalyst Award, highlighting women's participation and development in the school's community.

== Personal life ==
Carson speaks English, French, Spanish, and Mandarin, and as of July 2020 had been to 26 countries.
