= Kavya Manyapu =

Indian aerospace engineer

Kavya K.Manyapu
- Born: 1987 or 1988 (age 38–39); India
- Education: Georgia Tech (BS); Massachusetts Institute of Technology (MS); University of North Dakota (Ph.D) Potti Sriramulu Telugu University (Diploma in Bharatanatyam)
- Employer: NASA previously Boeing

Kavya K. Manyapu is an Indian–American aerospace engineer, space scientist and artist. She currently works at NASA in the Extravehicular Branch for Lunar Exploration missions (Artemis program) within the Flight Operations Directorate at JSC. She was part of the Boeing team that developed the CST-100 Starliner spacecraft for nearly 10 years. She developed a novel technology for self-cleaning space suits that uses carbon nanotubes to repel dust for use in future lunar and Mars missions.

== Early life and career ==
Manyapu grew up in Hyderabad, India. When she was 16, her family moved to the United States. She received a bachelor's degree in Aerospace Engineering from Georgia Institute of Technology in 2006 and a master's degree in aeronautics and astronautics from MIT in 2010. She also holds a Diploma in performing arts (Bharatanatyam) from Potti Sreeramulu Telugu University. She served as a crew member on multiple Analog/simulated Mars/asteroid Missions. She joined Boeing in 2005 as an intern and since 2010 she has been working on the CST-100 Starliner, a spacecraft that would transport crew to the ISS. She held multiple roles in this project, including Spacesuit Lead, Flight Test Engineer, Flight Crew Operations and Flight Test Director.

She received her PhD in 2017 under the supervision of Pablo de León, becoming the first ever PhD graduate in the Department of Space Studies at the University of North Dakota. During her doctoral studies, she developed patented novel technology, a smart fabric for planetary space suits to address the problem of lunar dust that proved to be a major issue during Apollo missions. The fabric contains carbon nanotubes, which repel dust when an electric current is applied to them. She holds 8 patents on this technology. Early-generation prototypes of this fabric were launched into space for testing in April 2019 Manyapu became an adjunct professor of the Space Studies Department at the University of North Dakota in 2019.

Manyapu has received a number of awards for her work. She was selected as a Karman Fellow in 2024 by the Karman Project. In 2014, she received the Rotary National Award for Space Achievement Stellar Award. In 2016, she was one of nine people who won a Future Space Leader award. She was listed in 40 under 40 by Georgia State University in 2020 and in 2022 recognized as 40 under 40 by Georgia Institute of Technology She also received an Award and honorary title "Balashree" at a young age from the President of India for excellence and outstanding creativity and performance in Bharatanatyam.

== Personal life ==
Manyapu is a certified scuba diver and has a pilot's license. She is also an Indian classical dancer and received an award from the President of India and title 'Balashree' for excellence in performing arts. She is an amateur mountaineer and avid hiker.

== Selected publications ==
- Manyapu, Kavya K.; et al. (2017). "Proof of concept demonstration of novel technologies for lunar spacesuit dust mitigation". Acta Astronautica. 137: 472–481. Bibcode:2017AcAau.137..472M. doi:10.1016/j.actaastro.2017.05.005.
- Manyapu, Kavya K.; Peltz, Leora; De Leon, Pablo (2019). "Self-cleaning spacesuits for future planetary missions using carbon nanotube technology". Acta Astronautica. 157: 134–144. Bibcode:2019AcAau.157..134M. doi:10.1016/j.actaastro.2018.12.019. S2CID 115525594.
