= Trent Tresch =

American academic

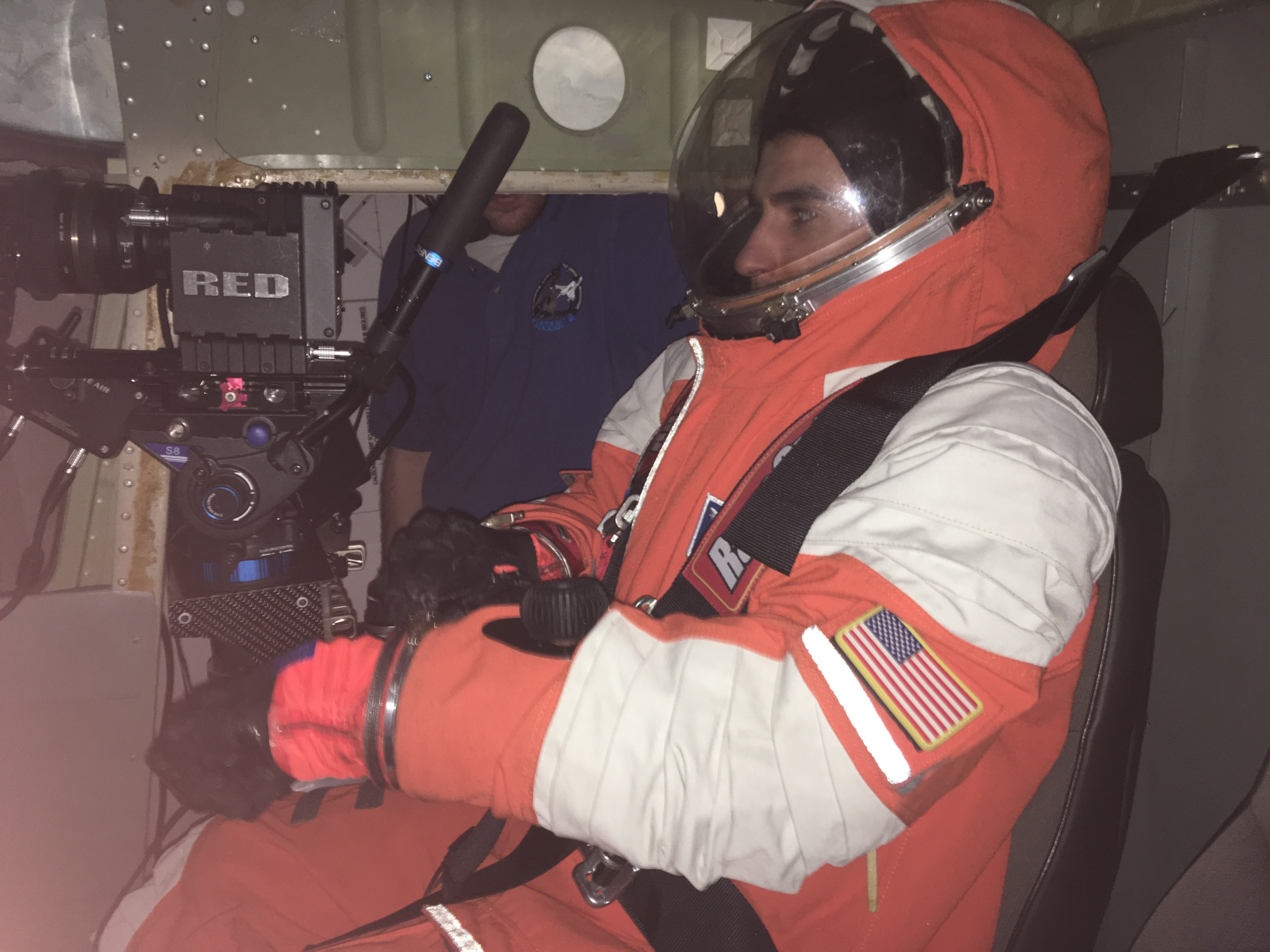
Tresch in IVA pressure suit at Embry Riddle Aeronautical University (2017)

Trent Tresch is an American explorer and academic. He was the founding director of the University of Arizona's Center for Human Space Exploration and Spacesuit Lab located at Biosphere 2.

Tresch's research and education initiatives support current space exploration. From human factors with Mars climbing simulations to space Artificial Intelligence operations with BINA48. He has developed lunar concrete with the Civil Air Patrol and mentored students under the NASA Space Grant.

In 2021, Trent took part in the Space Analog for the Moon and Mars initial life support and pressure tests. The same year, he led a team from the Explorers Club on a submarine expedition carrying club flag #211 to tag and track six gill sharks at the bottom of the Caribbean Sea off the coast of Central America.

In 2024, he was featured in William Shatner's TV series The UnXplained: Mysteries of the Universe for his work at the Biosphere 2.

In 2025, Trent was a prime crew member on the NASA Exploration Atmosphere tests, supporting research on new decompression protocols for the Artemis astronauts return to the Moon.

Tresch hold's numerous space technology inventions including a rescue spacesuit, urinary aid for pilots and astronauts, ionizing radiation and micrometeoroid shielding, hyperbaric medical transport device, inflatable habitat seals, sliding lunar emergency device, spacesuit manipulator hand, spacesuit weight transfer system, and a parachute stabilizer system.

== Select publications ==
- Smith, C.M. Staats, K. Tresch, T. Nevers, K. (2025) A Pressurized Emergency Shelter for Planetary Surface Operations. International Conference on Environmental Systems, Prague, Czech Republic.
- Smith, C.M. Tresch, T. et al. (2024) The Use of Pressurized Garments in Space Analog Facilities and Studies. Selected Proceedings of the 6th Space Resources Conference (pp.57-74)
- Walter-Range, M. Tresch, T. (2024) Sustainable Development of an Emerging Space Nation’s Economy. International Astronautical Congress, Milan, Italy
- Oommen, B. Staats, K. Tresch, T. et al. (2024) The Space Analog for the Moon and Mars (SAM): A hermetically-sealed and pressurized terrestrial analog station and research facility: from inception to crewed analog missions and beyond. International Astronautical Congress, Milan, Italy
- Staats, K. Tresch, T. et al. (2024) A Reduced Gravity Simulator at the Space Analog for the Moon & Mars (SAM) terrestrial habitat analog at Biosphere 2. International Astronautical Congress, Milan, Italy
- Smith, C.M. & Tresch, T. (2024) Maturation of an Experimental Nonpowered Mars Surface Exploration System. Journal of the British Interplanetary Society.
- Smith, C.M. & Tresch, T. (2019). Incidence of an Astronaut Not Sealing the Pressure Garment Visor on Reentry. Journal of Human Performance in Extreme Environments, Volume 15, Issue 1.

== Awards and honors ==
- Rothblatt Space Settlement Prize, 2025, StratoLab
- Air and Space Force Association, 2024, SWR-AZ-334 Davis Monthan Comp Sq. Radio Grant
- Arizona Space Grant Consortium, 2024, NASA Space Mentor
- British-American Fellow, 2024, International Leadership Fellow
- Rothblatt Space Settlement Prize, 2024, Spacesuits for Long Term Settlement
- Scale Up Program, 2023, Paris Peace Forum, An Inclusive Approach to the Space Economy
- National Science Foundation I-Corps Grant, 2023, Portable Hyperbaric Oxygen Therapy Chamber
- Blue Origin and National Space Society Grant, 2023, Spacesuit Operations and Training
- Rothblatt Space Settlement Prize, 2023, Building Opportunities for AI Neural Networks in Space
- Karman Fellow, 2023, Global Space Leadership Program
- NASA X-Hab Grant, 2021, University of Arizona TC-TSAC Life Support Re-design
- Spaceflight trainee, 2022, Uplift Aerospace
- Sustainable Oceans Alliance Grant, 2021, Six Gill Shark Research via Deep Ocean Submarine
- The Explorers Club Mamont Grant, 2019, Astronaut Parafoil Handle Deployment Locations
- United States Parachute Association STAR Award, 2019, Spacesuit Skydiving
- Polar Suborbital Science in the Upper Mesosphere, 2017, Candidate
