= Michael Masucci =

American aerospace engineer (born 1963)

- Born: 1963 (age 62–63); Philadelphia, Pennsylvania, U.S.
- Occupation: Test Pilot

Academic background
- Education: United States Air Force Academy (BS); California State University, Fresno (MS)

Academic work
- Institutions: Virgin Galactic
- Main interests: Human spaceflight; aviation
- Space career

Test Pilot
- Time in space: 1h 24m 4s
- Mission: VSS Unity VF-01; Virgin Galactic Unity 22; Virgin Galactic Unity 25; Galactic 01; Galactic 03; Galactic 05
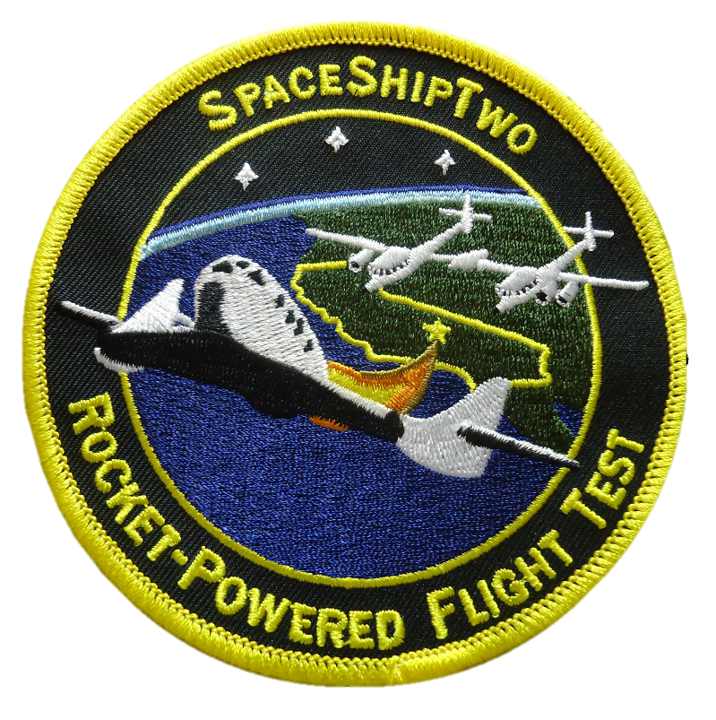
- Mission insignia

Michael "Sooch" Masucci (born 1963) is a test pilot for Virgin Galactic and a commercial astronaut. He is a former U.S. Air Force lieutenant colonel and Lockheed U-2 test pilot.

== Early life and education ==
Masucci was born in 1963 to an Italian-American family and grew up in Willow Grove, Pennsylvania, north of Philadelphia. He attended La Salle College High School, a Catholic all-boys preparatory school in Wyndmoor, Pennsylvania.

As an adolescent, Masucci was inspired by the Apollo program and followed the development of Skylab, the first American space station, and the Space Shuttle program closely. He applied to MIT and the United States Air Force Academy (USAFA), the only two undergraduate institutions offering degrees in astronautical engineering.

He graduated from the U.S. Air Force Academy in 1985 with a bachelor's degree in astronautical engineering. He began flying in 1982 and earned a private pilot license through the USAFA Aero Club, where he joined the flying team and participated in the gliding and parachuting programs. He later earned a master's degree in mechanical engineering from the California State University, Fresno.

== Career ==
After commissioning into the U.S. Air Force, Masucci attended pilot training at Vance Air Force Base in Oklahoma, where he flew the General Dynamics F-16 Fighting Falcon under call sign "Sooch". He was a Northrop T-38 Talon instructor for several years before moving to Beale Air Force Base in California to pilot the high-altitude Lockheed U-2 reconnaissance aircraft. Masucci became an instructor and evaluator for the U-2 program.

He later joined Edwards Air Force Base as a test pilot before teaching at the U.S. Air Force Test Pilot School. As a lieutenant colonel, he led the 1st Reconnaissance Squadron, the oldest flying unit in the U.S. military, and trained U-2 and Northrop Grumman RQ-4 Global Hawk pilots in conducting high-altitude reconnaissance missions.

After retiring from the Air Force in 2008, Masucci became a private pilot captain flying the Cessna Citation X for XOJET on charter flights.

In May 2013, Masucci joined Virgin Galactic as a test pilot and lead pilot trainer for SpaceShipTwo. He performed five test flights of VSS Enterprise and VSS Unity beginning in 2013 and first flew to space during the VSS Unity VF-01 mission on February 22, 2019. Masucci became the 6th commercial astronaut and 570th person in space.

He has since piloted 5 crewed Sub-orbital spaceflight missions, including Unity 22, Unity 25, Galactic 01, Galactic 03, and Galactic 05. In total, he has flown 11,000+ hours in 80 types of aircraft and gliders. He is an associate fellow of the Society of Experimental Test Pilots (SETP) and a member of the Aircraft Owners and Pilots Association (AOPA) and Experimental Aircraft Association (EAA).

== Awards ==
- Society of Experimental Test Pilots (SETP) J.H. Doolittle Award (2024)
- Society of Experimental Test Pilots (SETP) Fellow (2026)

== Test flights ==
- VSS Enterprise GF27
- VSS Enterprise GF29
- VSS Unity GF04
- VSS Unity GF07
- VSS Unity PF03
