= The Mars Generation (film) =

- Directed by: Michael Barnett
- Written by: Michael Barnett; Michael Mahaffie
- Produced by: Austin Francalancia; Clare Tucker
- Starring: Bob Behnken; Alayna Bidlack; Niko Blanks
- Edited by: Michael Mahaffie; Derek Boonstra
- Music by: Tyler Strickland
- Distributed by: Netflix
- Release date: May 5, 2017
- Running time: 97 minutes
- Country: United States
- Language: English

The Mars Generation is a 2017 documentary film directed by Michael Barnett about aspiring teenage astronauts at Space Camp and mankind's future journey to Mars.

The film premiered at the Sundance Film Festival in 2017 and was released by Netflix on May 5, 2017.

== Premise ==
Experts reflect on NASA's history and future, and provides an examination of what it will require to make the journey to Mars a reality.

== Cast ==
- Bob Behnken
- Zoe McElroy
- Alayna Bidlack
- Niko Blanks
- Charles F. Bolden Jr.
- Elsa Shiju
- Joseph Drew Carlton
- Alyssa Carson
- Colin Claytor
- Aurora Creamer
- Marisa Dimperio
- Jace Ezzell
- Bobak Ferdowsi
- Christopher Gorman
- Abigail Harrison
- Victoria Harrison
- John Holdren

== Reception ==
Josh Terry of the Deseret News gave it 3 out of 4 and wrote: "Does a good job of tapping into the inherent hope of exploring outer space and providing a realistic examination of what it will require."
