= Galactic 05 =

2023 private crewed suborbital spaceflight

- Mission type: Crewed sub-orbital spaceflight
- Operator: Virgin Galactic
- Mission duration: 14 min and 20 second
- Apogee: 87.2 km (54.2 mi)

Spacecraft properties
- Spacecraft: VSS Unity
- Spacecraft type: SpaceShipTwo
- Manufacturer: The Spaceship Company

Crew
- Crew size: 6
- Members: Michael Masucci; Kelly Latimer; Colin Bennett; Alan Stern; Kellie Gerardi; Ketty Maisonrouge

Start of mission
- Launch date: 2 November 2023, 15:00 UTC
- Launch site: Spaceport America Runway 34
- Deployed from: VMS Eve

End of mission
- Landing date: 2 November 2023, 15:59 UTC
- Landing site: Spaceport America Runway 34
- Galactic 05 mission patch VSS Unity spaceflights

Galactic 05 was a crewed sub-orbital spaceflight of the SpaceShipTwo-class VSS Unity, which launched on 2 November 2023. It was the fifth commercial spaceflight and tenth overall spaceflight for American aerospace company Virgin Galactic.

== Crew ==
Galactic 05's crew included three private passengers and three Virgin Galactic employees.

Position	Crew
Commander	(United States) Michael Masucci; Sixth spaceflight
Pilot	(United States) Kelly Latimer; Third and last spaceflight
Astronaut instructor	(United Kingdom) Colin Bennett; Third spaceflight
Researcher	(United States) Alan Stern; First spaceflight
Payload Specialist	(United States) Kellie Gerardi; First spaceflight
Tourist	(France) (Italy) Ketty Maisonrouge; First spaceflight

Stern performed studies of human body's reaction to zero-gravity by wearing a biomedical monitoring harness. He also wanted to develop in-space operation of a particular high-tech camera that is planned to be used on an astronomical research mission in the future by NASA. His flight and research were financed by Southwest Research Institute.

Gerardi flew the Galactic 05 mission as a payload specialist doing scientific research with Alan Stern, a private passenger also on board. Onboard, Gerardi operated three biomedical and thermodynamic fluid experiments on behalf of IIAS (International Institute for Astronautical Sciences, a private international education and research facility). Gerardi operated a fluid cell designed to help better predict and control the shape and location of fluid within a container in microgravity. She also wore the Astroskin biomonitoring device to collect a wide range of biometric data during her flight. A third experiment studied insulin-resistance during spaceflight, and Gerardi wore a Continuous Glucose Monitor (CGM) to measure and store glucose readings. Her flight was paid for by IIAS and the research done was developed by National Research Council of Canada.

== See also ==
- List of spaceflight launches in July–December 2023
