= Virgin Galactic Unity 25 =

2023 American crewed sub-orbital spaceflight

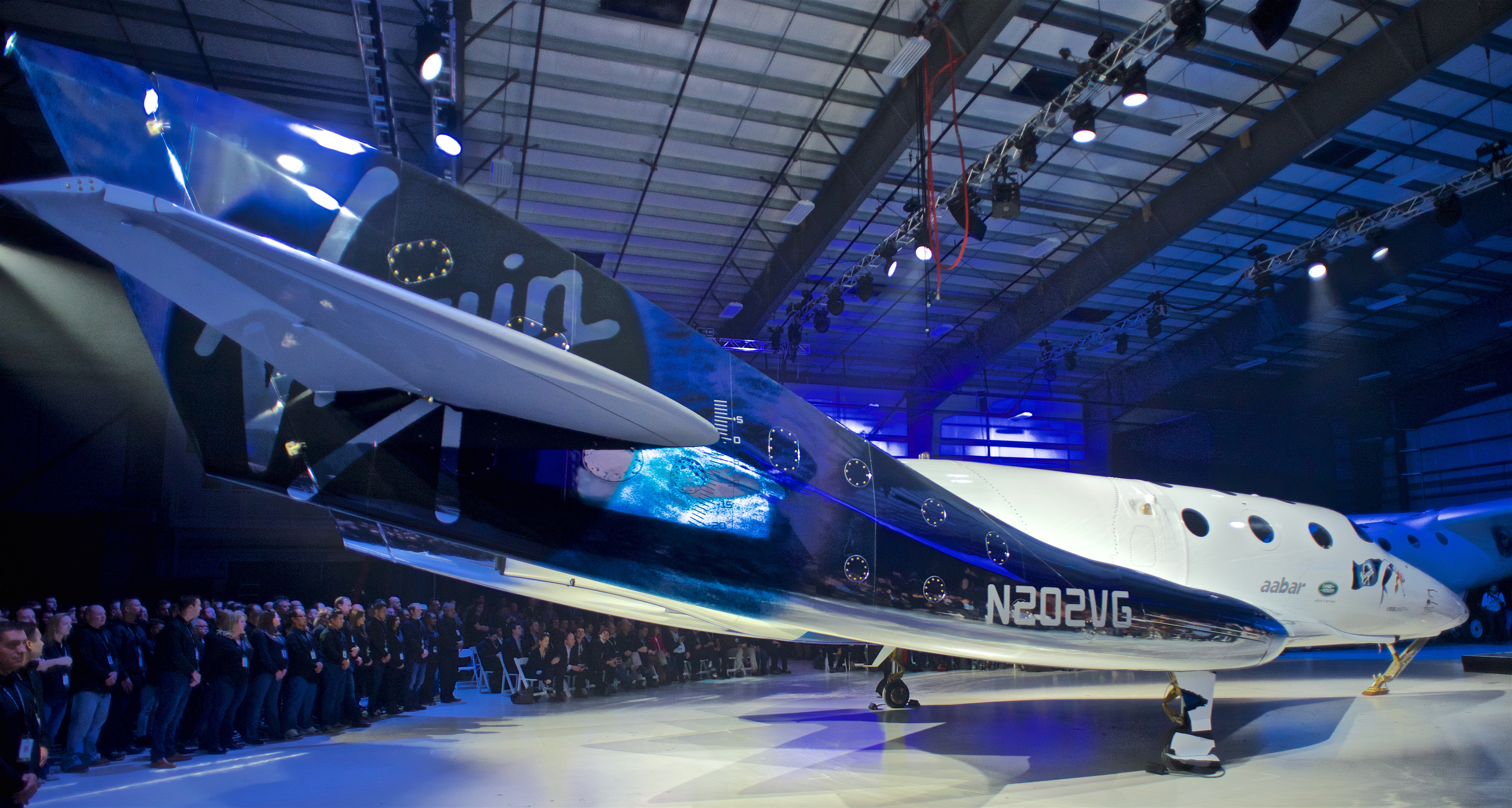
- VSS Unity in February 2016
- Mission type: Crewed sub-orbital spaceflight
- Operator: Virgin Galactic
- Mission duration: 14 minutes
- Apogee: 87.2 km (54.2 mi)

Spacecraft properties
- Spacecraft: VSS Unity
- Spacecraft type: SpaceShipTwo
- Manufacturer: The Spaceship Company

Crew
- Crew size: 6
- Members: Michael Masucci; Frederick W. Sturckow; Beth Moses; Luke Mays; Jamila Gilbert; Christopher Huie

Start of mission
- Launch date: 25 May 2023 15:15:00 UTC
- Launch site: Spaceport America Runway 34

End of mission
- Landing date: 25 May 2023 16:37:00 UTC
- Landing site: Spaceport America Runway 34
- Virgin Galactic Unity 25 mission patch VSS Unity spaceflights

Virgin Galactic Unity 25 was a sub-orbital spaceflight by Virgin Galactic that took place on 25 May 2023. The flight used their SpaceShipTwo spaceplane VSS Unity. The crew consisted of six Virgin Galactic employees. Unity 25 was the first spaceflight for the company since Unity 22 in 2021, when founder Richard Branson flew to space.

== Background ==
Unity 25 was the first spaceflight for Virgin Galactic since Richard Branson flew to space in July 2021. The company had planned to fly a research flight for the Italian Air Force, Unity 23, later that year, but the fleet was temporarily grounded following an error during Branson's flight, along with upgrades and modifications being made to the vehicles. Virgin Galactic plans to fly its first commercial flight in late June 2023, following Unity 25's success.

== Crew ==
The crew of Unity 25 included two pilots and four passengers, all being employees at Virgin Galactic. Both pilots have flown SpaceShipTwo to space previously, and CJ Sturckow has flown to space on the Space Shuttle. Of the four passengers, only Beth Moses had flown to space before.

Position	Crew
Commander	(United States) Michael Masucci; Third spaceflight
Pilot	(United States) Frederick W. "CJ" Sturckow; Seventh spaceflight
Astronaut Instructor	(United States) Beth Moses; Third spaceflight
Passenger	(United States) (Jamaica) Christopher Huie; Only spaceflight
Passenger	(United States) Jamila Gilbert; Only spaceflight
Passenger	(United States) Luke Mays; Only spaceflight

== Flight ==
The mission was Virgin Galactic's fifth spaceflight. VMS Eve, a WhiteKnightTwo mothership, took off from Spaceport America in New Mexico, and carried VSS Unity in a parasite configuration before releasing it. From there, the spaceplane ignited its rocket engine and flew to over 50 mi (80 km) in altitude, above the U.S. definition for the start of space, but below the FAI-defined Kármán line at 100 km (62 mi). It then reentered the atmosphere and landed on the same runway it took off from.
