= Melania Guerra =

Strategy scientist

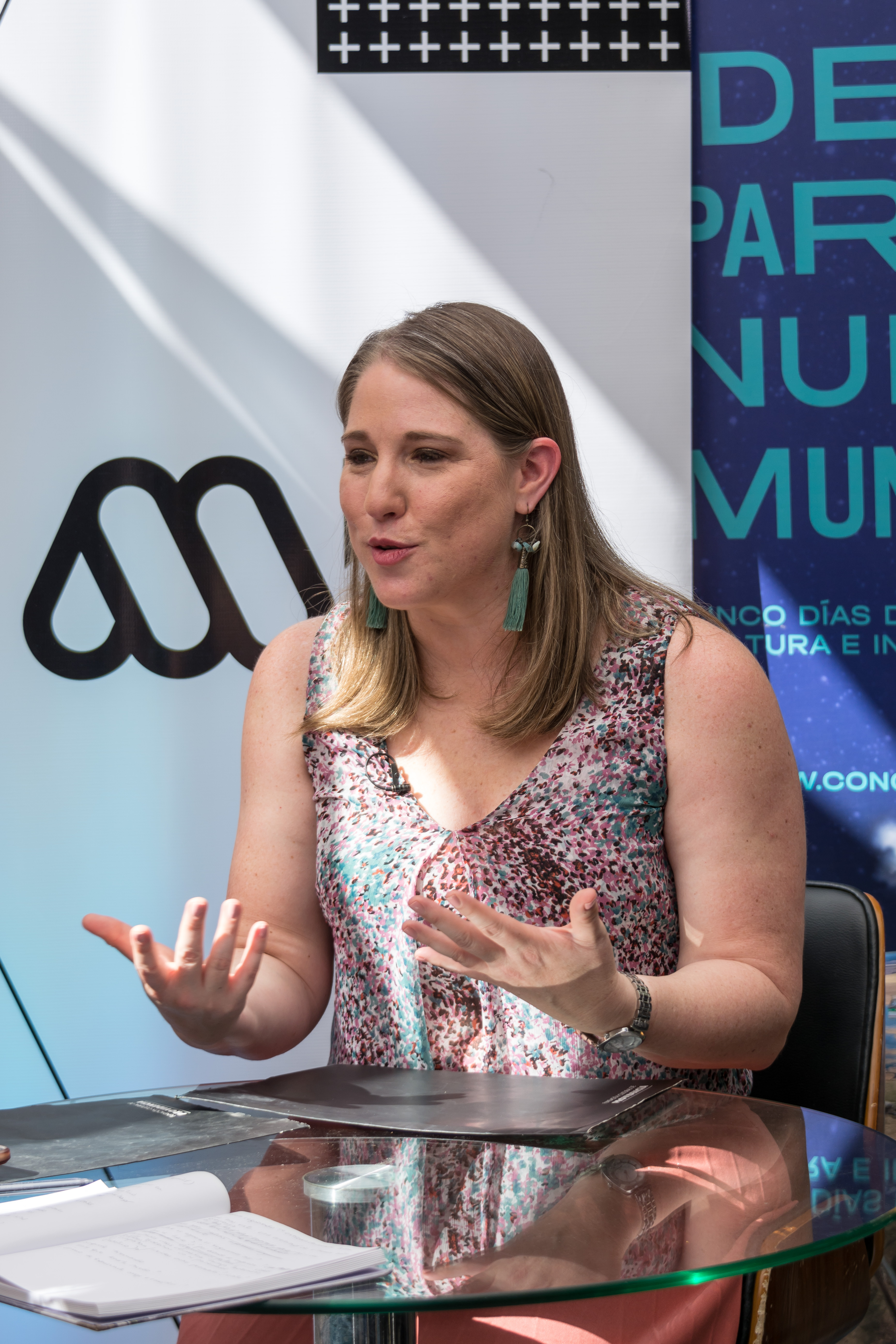
Melania Guerra

Melania Guerra (born June 23, 1978) is a strategy scientist, connecting scientific knowledge and policy making. Guerra's background is in mechanical engineering, research, marine science, and advocating for climate change, ocean conservation and female empowerment.

== Early life and education ==
Melania Guerra was born June 23, 1978, in Costa Rica and grew up as part of a family of four, including her mother, a preschool teacher; her father a computer programmer; and her brother who is today an industrial engineer.

She earned her bachelor's degree in Costa Rica in 2001 and moved to the United States where she earned her Master of Science and Ph.D. in Oceanography from the University of California San Diego. Later, Guerra was an Arctic underwater researcher at Cornell and Washington universities, where she specialized in researching acoustic data in the Arctic Ocean. In 2021, Guerra earned her second Master's degree in public policy from Princeton University, specializing in international science policy.

== Career ==
Guerra earned her Bachelor of Science degree in Mechanical Engineering from the Universidad de Costa Rica in 2001. Afterwards, she moved to the US in 2002, following an opportunity to work and intern with Don Franklin Chang, a Costa Rican astronaut, at NASA in Houston Texas.

In 2003 Guerra moved to San Diego and the University of California to continue her educational journey. Guerra completed her Master of Science in Oceanography at Scripps institution of Oceanography. She continued at the University of California until earning her Doctor of Philosophy (Ph.D.) in Oceanography in 2011.

After completing her Ph.D., Guerra was a Postdoctoral researcher at Cornell University at the Bioacoustics Research Program until 2013, then she became a Research Associate at a lab in the University of Washington for two years researching marine mammals and the impact of noise pollution on them. Guerra has specialized in analyzing the impacts of climate change and noise pollution on marine mammals. She used acoustic data to learn about the changes affecting the mammals in the Arctic Ocean. Guerra participated in many research expeditions to the Arctic, Mexico, Alaska, Greenland and along the coasts of California. During her research and listening to underwater voices, Guerra wanted to become a representative and an agent for the oceans and for marine life. Noticing the effects of climate change on the mammals she was researching, combined with the noise pollution they were experiencing encouraged her to speak up and to get involved in policies regarding the safety of the oceans. In addition, Guerra has participated in Costa Rican delegations negotiating international climate and oceanic conditions.

In 2018 Guerra was chosen to participate in the Nippon Fellowship of the United Nations. The Nippon fellowship is a prestigious fellowship which is offered to professionals from developing countries that hold knowledge about the oceans and seas. The fellows receive training and knowledge about international legal issues, governance, and practices concerning ocean affairs. The fellows also get an opportunity to conduct their individual research. Graduate fellows are expected to return to their home countries and be vital in designing ocean policy.

Guerra represented Costa Rica in the Homeward Bound expedition in 2019 to Antarctica, which is a global women leadership initiative in the science field. The initiative's intention is to create a women scientists' network and support the leaders in their roles when fighting for sustainability and climate change public policies.

Dr. Melania Guerra is the Head of the Climate Science and Impacts and works out of the Climate Analytics' Berlin Office. In 2022 she was selected as a Karman Fellow for her work.

In 2024, Guerra was listed in Forbes Central America as one of the 100 most powerful women in Central America for achievements such as working doing research regarding the oceans and the geographical poles.
