= Kellie Gerardi =

American social media influencer and defense professional (born 1989)

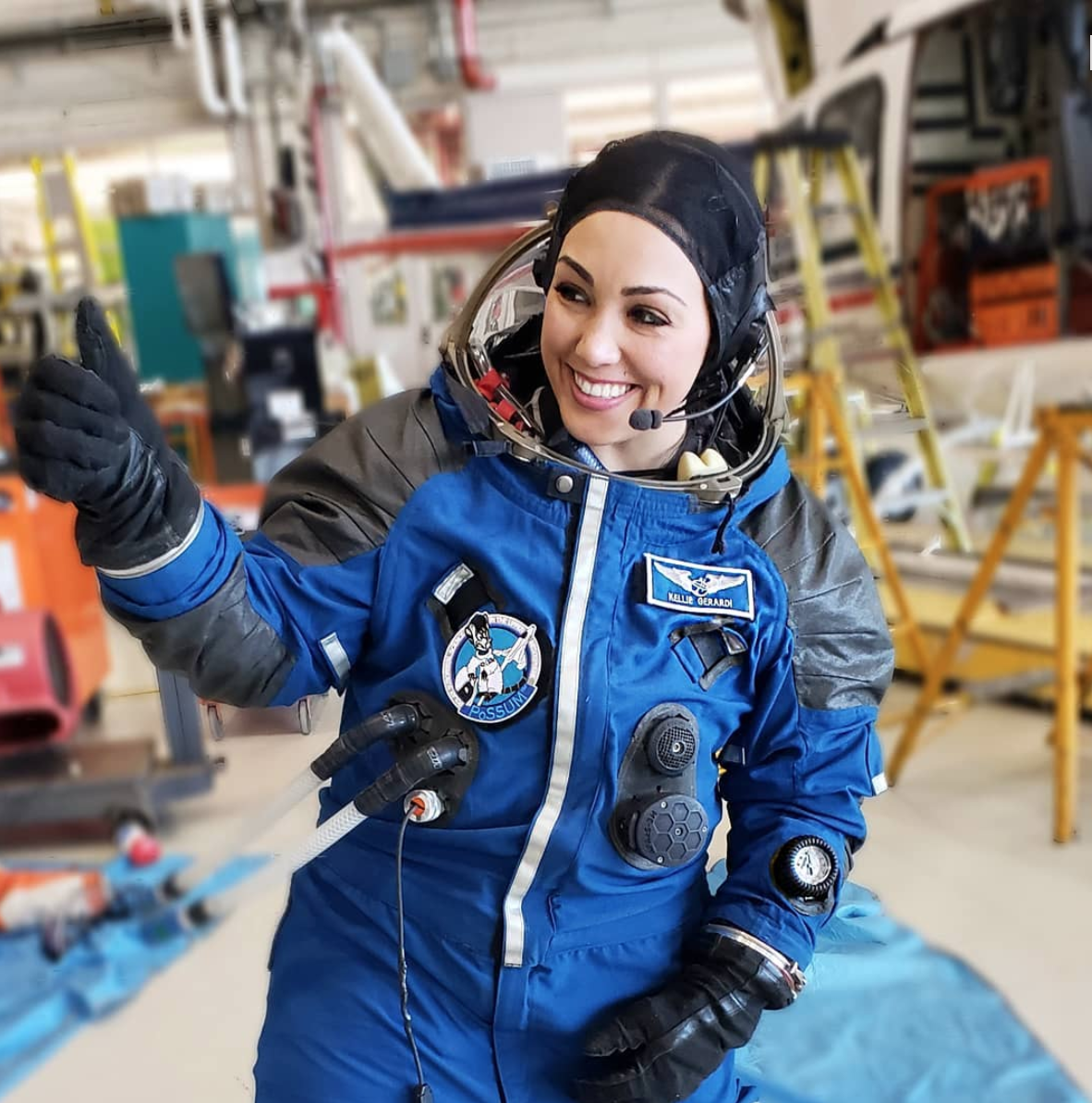
- Born: February 16, 1989 (age 37); Jupiter, Florida
- Education: Barnard College; New York University
- Employer: Institute for Astronautical Sciences
- Known for: Citizen science
- Spouse: Steven Baumruk (m. 2015)
- Children: 2
- Website: kelliegerardi.com

Kellie Gerardi (born February 16, 1989) is an American social media influencer, defense professional, and commercial astronaut who is known for a sub-orbital spaceflight with Virgin Galactic and her candidacy for the Mars One reality television show.

Gerardi previously worked at Palantir Technologies as a lead on the company's mission operations team and is the director of human spaceflight operations for the International Institute for Astronautical Sciences. She is scheduled to lead an all-female sub-orbital spaceflight with Virgin Galactic in 2026.

Gerardi was among the first 100 women in space. In 2025, she won a Webby Award for sharing her personal struggles with fertility on social media, was listed in Time's 100 creators, and named one of USA Today's women of the year.

== Early life and education ==
Kellie Gerardi was born on February 16, 1989 in Jupiter, Florida.

She graduated from Jupiter Community High School in 2007. She said she watched space shuttles launch from Cape Canaveral from her bedroom window. She worked at Claire's while she was in high school.

Gerardi studied Documentary filmmaking at Barnard College and transferred to New York University (NYU), graduating in 2011 with a Bachelor of Arts in film.

In 2025, she was awarded an honorary doctorate from the University of Advancing Technology.

== Career ==
Gerardi became a media specialist at the Commercial Spaceflight Federation, a commercial spaceflight lobbying group, in 2012. She also worked in business development at Masten Space Systems.

In 2015, she began working for Palantir Technologies, a software company, as a technical project manager for its philanthropic clients. As of 2024, she worked as a lead on the company's mission operations team, which provides customers like the United States Space Force with logistical and analytical support with the use of its data analysis software Gotham.

Gerardi says she is professionally driven to democratize access to space and expand "Earth's economic sphere within the commercial space industry". In a 2015 contribution to HuffPost, she said reduced costs associated with spaceflight would extend the economy into space with lunar and low-earth orbit business opportunities.

As of February 2026, Gerardi is Director of Human Spaceflight for the International Institute for Astronautical Sciences. She also works as an instructor and flight test director for microgravity courses and research campaigns.

=== Citizen science and commercial spaceflight research ===
After meeting Richard Garriott at The Explorers Club, where she worked the coat check, in 2014, Gerardi decided to join as a member. She later served on the board of directors, and is on the Truman National Security Project's Defense Council.

In 2014, Gerardi was accepted as candidate for the Mars One mission, an organization that planned to colonize Mars as a reality television show, which gained her national attention. The organization received harsh criticism from the scientific community and went bankrupt before a mission could be conducted. In February 2014, she spent two months as a crew member at the Mars Desert Research Station (MDRS), a Mars analog habitat operated by the Mars Society. In 2015, she wrote an essay in Popular Mechanics about her experience at the MDRS, which included wearing a space suit. In an interview with Popular Science, she said they tested the ability to grow hops in a simulated Martian regolith using Earthen soil as a control.

In 2017, Gerardi joined a private international education and research facility called the International Institute for Astronautical Sciences (IIAS). She completed a program called "Project PoSSUM", which stands for polar suborbital science in the upper mesosphere, which includes study on topics such as bioastronautics and training in high-altitude flights to experience weightlessness. Gerardi is IIAS's director of human spaceflight operations.

On November 2, 2023, Gerardi was a payload specialist aboard Galactic 05, a sub-orbital spaceflight operated by the space tourism company Virgin Galactic, also boarded by Alan Stern. The trip lasted around two hours from take off to return. Onboard, she collected research data for three experiments focused on the physiology of microgravity developed by the National Research Council of Canada and sponsored by IIAS. Gerardi performed a fluid dynamic test for future designs of syringes and humidifiers specific to spaceflight. She wore a smart undergarment that collects biometric data during her flight developed by Canadian startup Hexoskin Astroskin and the Canadian Space Agency. She also wore a Continuous Glucose Monitor (CGM) to passively measure glucose levels to investigate any relation between high-altitude flight and insulin resistance. She was among the first 100 women to go to space.

In June 2024, Virgin Galactic announced Gerardi as a crew member on a second research spaceflight scheduled for as early as 2026 aboard the Company’s Delta Class spaceship. The mission is designed to enable IIAS to introduce new research while also expanding upon the results from the Galactic 05 mission. Gerardi will be leading an all-female, international research space flight crew from IIAS.

=== Science communication and social media ===
Gerardi is a popular science communicator and social media influencer. As of March 2024, she had over 764,000 followers on TikTok and over 1.3 million followers on Instagram. She has brand partnerships with Sun Chips and Rykä. She began her social media career as a teenager on YouTube filming popular Christmas content of her family, when the site was new.

In 2020, Mango Publishing published her first book, Not Necessarily Rocket Science: A Beginner's Guide To Life in the Space Age. She has also created children's books about space called Luna Muna.

In 2021 and 2023, she walked in New York Fashion Week shows, wearing her navy space suit and a space-themed dress she designed, respectively. In 2021, Gerardi partnered with NASA to host the first all-female episode of NASA Science Live during Women's History Month. In 2025, she was selected as the "Godmother" for Royal Caribbean International's new cruise ship, Star of the Seas.

== Recognition ==
In 2025, USA Today named Gerardi one of its Women of the Year, Time listed her in its 100 creators list, and she won a Webby Award for Best Community Engagement for her social media posts about her struggles with fertility, in vitro fertilization (IVF), and miscarriage.

In 2026, Mattel created a Barbie doll in Gerardi's likeness, naming her an official "Barbie role model" and member of the first "Barbie dream team".

== Personal life ==
In 2015, Gerardi's space-themed wedding to German-born Steven Baumruk was officiated by astronaut Michael López-Alegría, a commander of the International Space Station. In 2017, Gerardi gave birth to the couple's daughter, Delta V, who was named for delta-v, the quantitative measure of a change in velocity.

Gerardi has shared on her TikTok account her struggles with secondary infertility. Gerardi underwent IVF in early 2025, leading to a first-trimester miscarriage. Throughout the process, she shared her struggles on social media to help de-stigmatize miscarriage. In late 2025, Gerardi began another round of IVF which she documented on social media. In April 2026, Gerardi gave birth to her second daughter, Maxine Quinn.

Gerardi lives in Jupiter, Florida, with her husband and their daughters.
