= Eiman Jahangir =

Iranian-American cardiologist and commercial astronaut

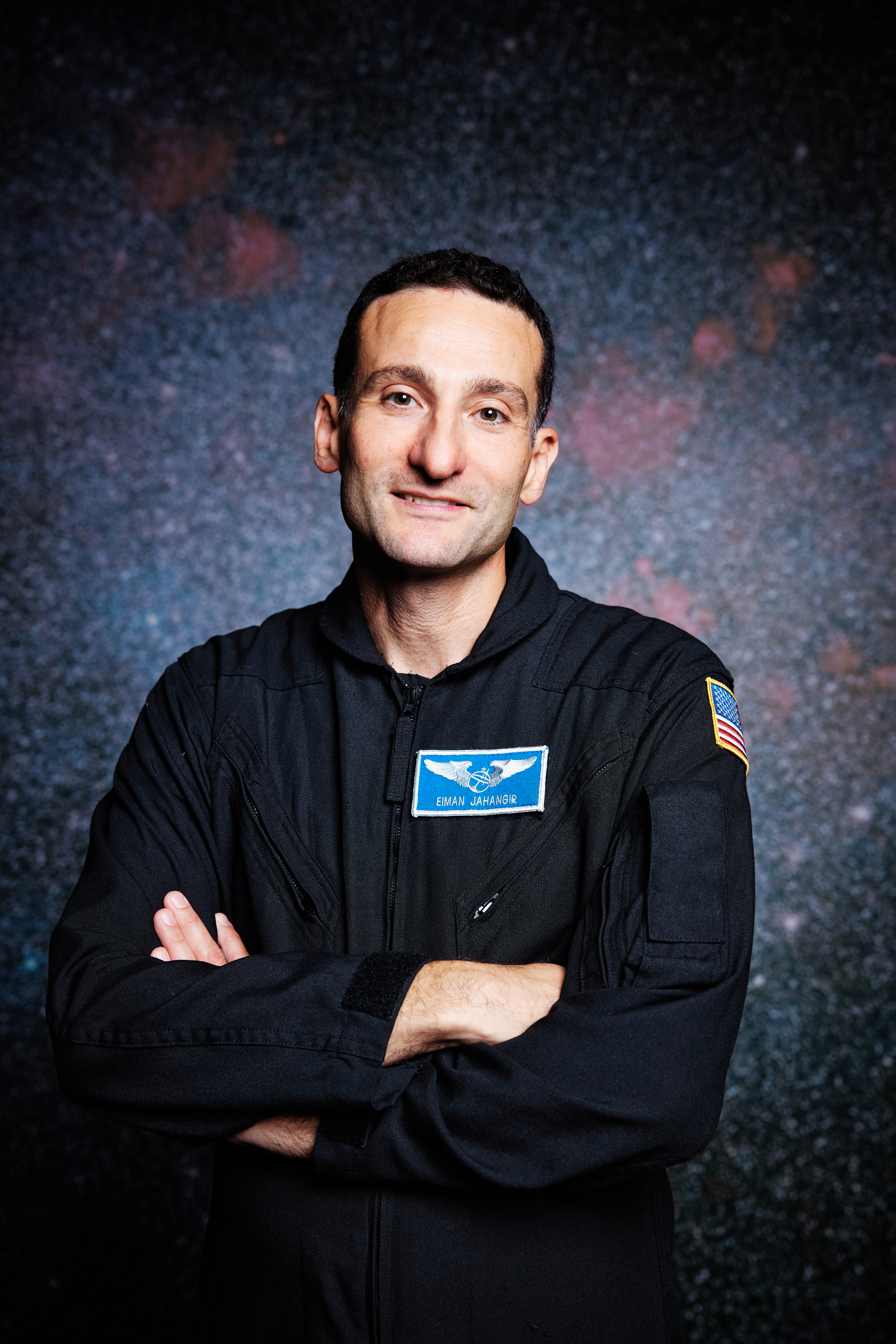
- Jahangir in 2024
- Born: Tehran, Iran
- Citizenship: Iranian-American
- Education: George Washington University, University of Tennessee, Vanderbilt University
- Occupations: Cardiologist, Professor and Commercial Astronaut
- Known for: Cardiologist and first Iranian man to travel to space on commercial flight
- Space career
- Missions: Blue Origin NS-26
- Website: www.eimanjahangir.com

Eiman Jahangir is an Iranian-American commercial astronaut, academic and cardiologist.

Jahangir practices medicine at Vanderbilt University Medical Center, where he is a Professor of Medicine and Radiology.

== Background ==
Jahangir was born in Tehran, Iran and grew up in Nashville. He earned his medical degree from the University of Tennessee and Bachelors of Arts in Religious Studies at the George Washington University. He proceeded with his Master’s of Public Health at Vanderbilt University.

Jahangir's focus is Cardio-Oncology, and he is passionate about human spaceflight. He was a finalist for NASA's Astronaut Candidate program, in 2009 and 2013. He was the mission medical officer for the Space Analog for the Moon and Mars at the University of Arizona's Biosphere 2.

As of 2026, he has an academic H-Index of 28 with over 24,000 citations of his researched works.

== Flight to space ==
Jahangir flew to space on Blue Origin's New Shepard-26 on August 29, 2024, reaching an apogee of 105 km. His flight is also linked to two research studies: Vanderbilt’s Clonal Hematopoiesis and Inflammation in the Vasculature (CHIVE) registry and biorepository, and the Space Omics and Medical Atlas (SOMA) study at Cornell University. The SOMA study investigates whether spaceflight impacts genetic mutations in blood stem cells by comparing data collected before and after the flight. In September 2025 his flight suit was put on display at the Adventure Science Center Museum in Nashville.

== Publications ==
In August 2026, Jahangir published his first book titled A Heart for Space: An Astronaut's Guide to Achieving the Impossible.

== Awards and Honors ==
- In 2026 he was selected as a global space fellow with the Karman Project.
- In 2024 he was announced as an Overview Ambassador with Space for Humanity.
- In 2012 he received the Rhodes Award for Scholarly Activity in Cardiovascular Medicine
