= Final Frontier Design =

American aerospace design company

- Type: Private
- Industry: Aerospace
- Founded: 2010
- Headquarters: Brooklyn, NYC, NY, United States
- Key people: Ted Southern (President) Nik Moiseev (Lead Designer)
- Services: space suit design, space suit gloves
- Website: Final Frontier Design

Final Frontier Design is a seed-stage startup company that builds and tests spacesuits. The company's products both enable, and are enabled by, the more recent lower-cost access to space epitomized by NewSpace launch companies such as SpaceX, Virgin Galactic and XCOR Aerospace. FFD was awarded a Phase I SBIR in 2011 and developed pressure garment glove technology under this contract.

In July 2011, Final Frontier Design won third place in the 2011 NewSpace Business Plan Competition in Silicon Valley, sponsored by the Space Frontier Foundation.

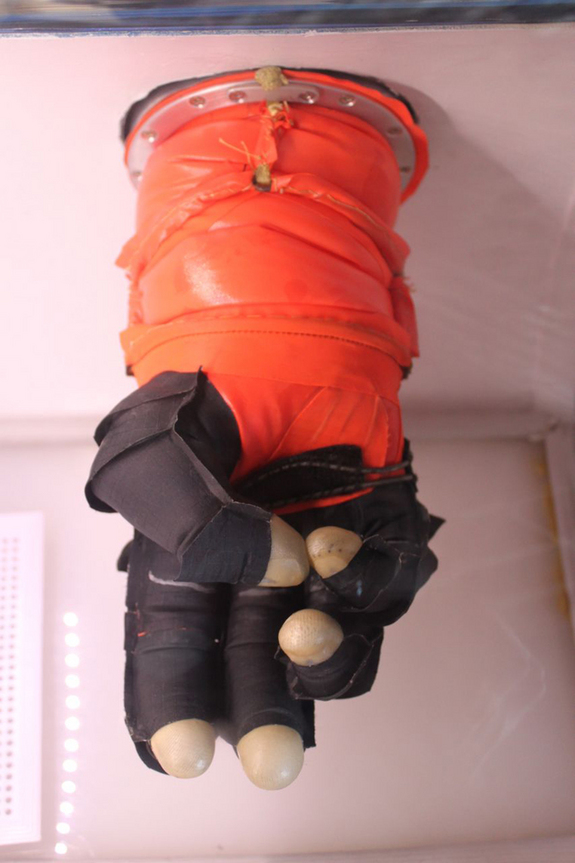
Extravehicular activity prototype glove

In December 2014, Final Frontier Design obtained an official Space Act Agreement with NASA.

In January 2022, the company was acquired by Paragon Space Development Corporation.

== Company ==
Final Frontier Design was founded in 2010 by "artist and designer" Ted Southern, a former Eyebeam resident, and his partner Nikolay Moiseev, "a Russian mechanical engineer," with the intent to "craft affordable yet highly capable spacesuits for a burgeoning commercial spaceflight industry."

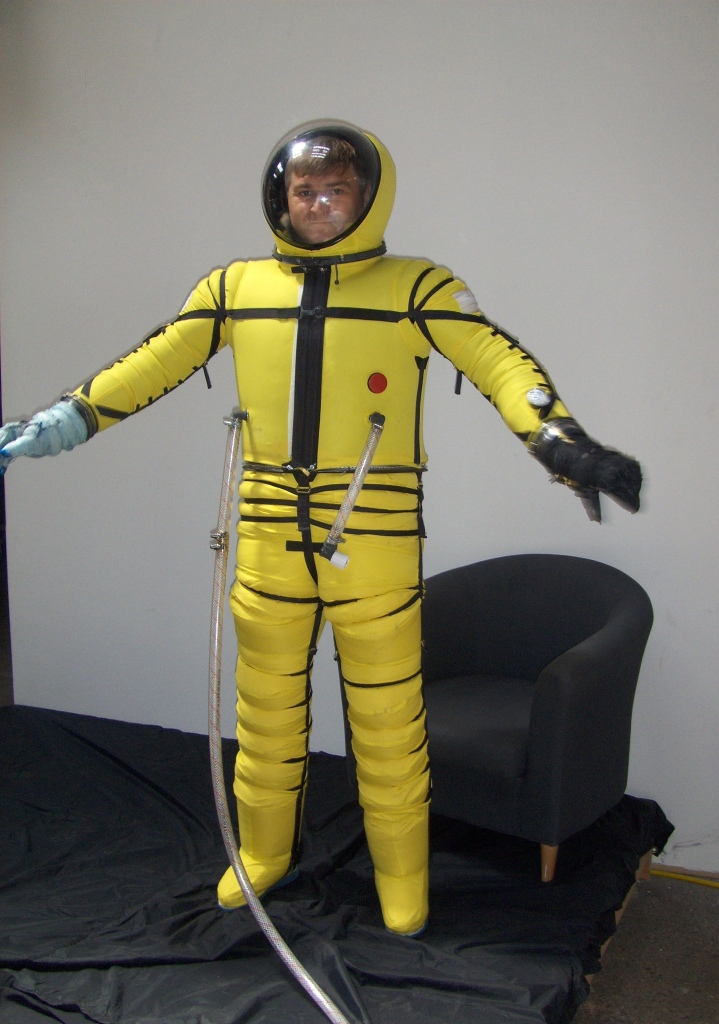
FFD Prime suit

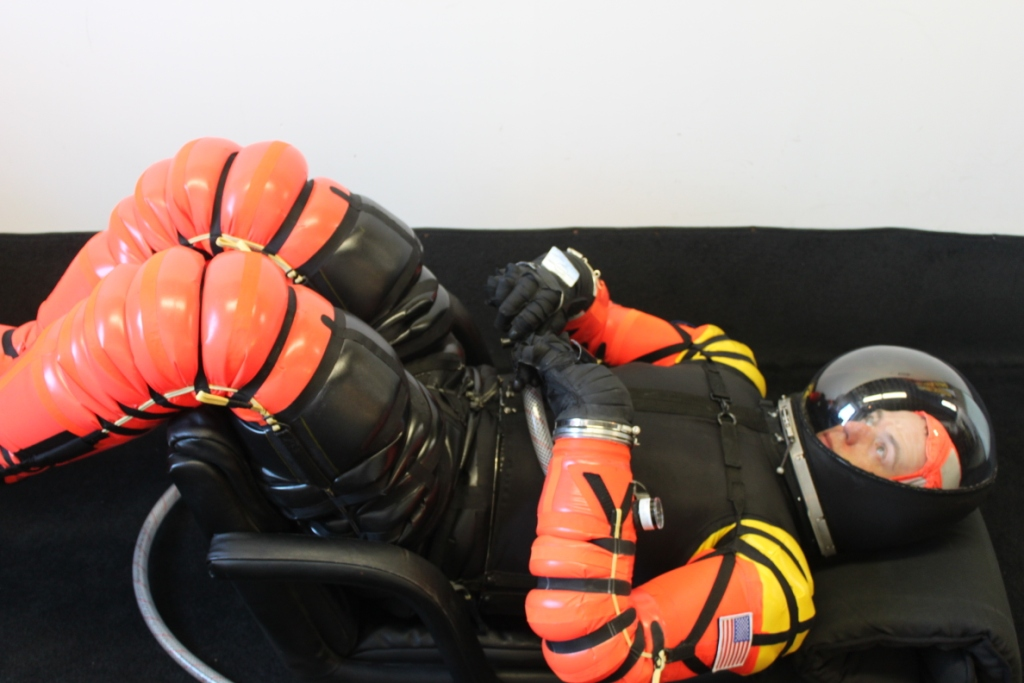
FFD Second generation space suit

== Intra-vehicular activity suit ==
Final Frontier is developing a low-cost commercial inside-the-spacecraft spacesuit called an Intra-Vehicular Activity suit (IVA) which can be pressurized in the event of an emergency, and is projecting to sell the suit at a price of about a fifth of the NASA cost for its existing line of IVA suits that cost around $250,000 each. With the suit weighing a bit under 15 pounds (6.8 kg)—versus 30 pounds with the NASA suit—could result in economically significant reduction in fuel costs for a flight with a number of astronauts. Final Frontier Design is building its third-generation spacesuit, according to the NASA flight certification standards. Its improvements over the second-generation spacesuit include the ability to withstand greater operating pressure, a carbon fiber waist ring, a retractable helmet, and improved gloves and glove disconnects. The pair took to Kickstarter in June 2012 to raise money for the design and construction of a prototype commercial space suit for intra-vehicular travel — meaning activities that take place inside a spacecraft. Final Frontier had raked in more than $27,000 in July 2012 from 386 backers, exceeding their $20,000 fundraising goal. The goal of the Kickstarter project is to prep a third-generation suit to present to NASA for flight certification by 2013.
