= Nidhan Singh Chugha =

Ghadar movement leader

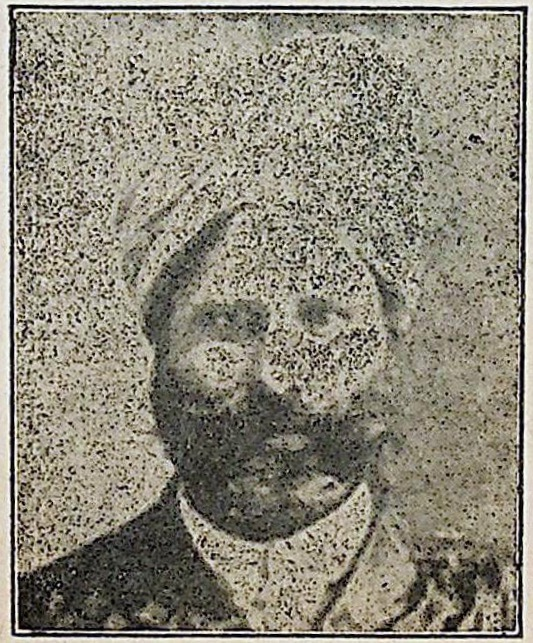
- Born: Nidhan Singh; June 1855; Chugha, Ferozepur district, Punjab Province, British India (present-day Moga district, Punjab, India)
- Died: 6 December 1936 (aged 81); Moga, Punjab
- Other names: Jagjit Singh (Khalsa name)
- Spouse(s): Gursharan Kaur of Pootung, Shanghai
- Children: Bijay Singh
- Father: Sundar Singh

Nidhan Singh Chugha (June 1855 – 6 December 1936) was a Ghadarite leader. (Note: 'Chugha' is alternatively spelt as 'Chuggha'. His name is alternatively spelt as 'Nidham'.) He was considered one of the most dangerous and prominent Ghadarites by the British authorities.

== Biography ==
=== Early life ===
Nidhan Singh was born in 1855 in the village of Chugha in modern-day Moga district, Punjab to a father named Sundar Singh. One source states he was born earlier in 1851.

=== Move to China ===
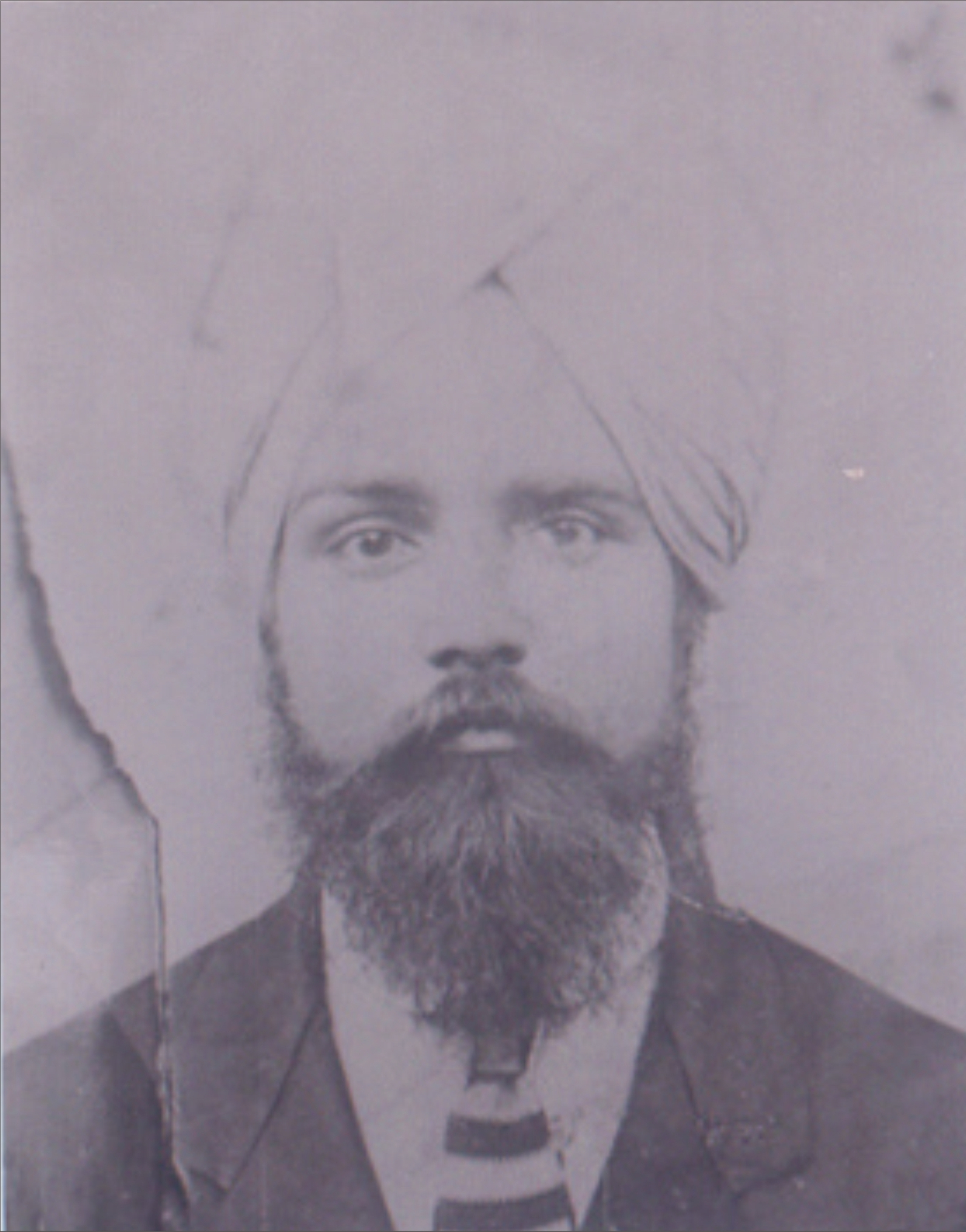
Portrait photograph of Nidhan Singh 'Chugha' in his youth

In 1882, Nidhan departed India for Shanghai, where he was employed as a watchman and later became the treasurer of the local gurdwara. He had helped construct the local gurdwara.

Whilst in China, Nidhan Singh married an ethnic Chinese woman according to Sikh religious rites, having one son with her whom they named Bijay Singh. Nidhan Singh married the Chinese lady in August 1909 on a Sunday in Shanghai at the Dongbaoxing Road Gurdwara. His Chinese bride was a native of Pootung (Pudong), had a well-known desire to convert to Sikhism that was known to the Indian community, and she was very happy to be married. This Chinese woman converted to Sikhism and was baptized as Gursharan Kaur whilst Nidhan was baptized as Jagjit Singh in an Amrit Sanchar ceremony. The wedding ceremony itself was an Anand Karaj, where the bride was led by the groom four times in a circumabulation around the Guru Granth Sahib, with a bow given before the scripture after every revolution. A large amount of local Sikhs attended the interracial Sino-Sikh wedding, including 20 women. This was the first interracial Chinese-Sikh wedding to take place at the Dongbaoxing Road Gurdwara.

Nidhan Singh resided in Shanghai for a number of years before eventually moving to the United States.

=== Settling in the United States of America ===
Around the time Nidhan Singh moved to U.S.A., the Ghadar Party was established by Indian nationalists. Nidhan became a member of the Ghadar Party and was elected as a constituent of the executive committee of the party. In April 1914, Nidhan was elected as the president of the Khalsa Diwan Society of Stockton, California.

=== Preparations for instigating an anti-British rebellion ===
During the First World War, Nidhan, alongside other high-ranking Ghadarites, returned to India for the purpose of instigating an armed uprising against the British. With the intention of ultimately returning to India, he first embarked aboard the S.S. Korea in San Francisco on 29 August 1914, disembarking at Nagasaki, Japan alongside Piara Singh (of Langeri, Hoshiarpur) and three others, and moving further onward to Shanghai, China, where he collected money for the Ghadarite cause. Some of the funds that Nidhan collected in Shanghai had originally been donated for those aboard the Komagata Maru, however due to the ship not being given permission to land in Shanghai, the funds for its cause were allocated to Nidhan Singh instead for his own Ghadarite agenda. Whilst in Shanghai, Nidhan Singh sent a telegram to the Ghadarites who landed in Manila, warning them that the authorities at Hong Kong were going to stringently search the vessel for weapons and seditious literature. Due to this warning, the Ghadarites on the other ship threw all their seditious literature overboard and their revolvers and ammunition had been given to the Ghadarite leaders to possess. Nidhan Singh paid a visit to his Chinese wife and infant, mixed-race son whilst he stayed in Shanghai during this time.

Nidhan Singh left Shanghai aboard the Mashima Maru with this monetary sum and 600 rounds of ammunition, with the Tosa Maru carrying some of his Ghadarite affiliates. Both of the ships landed in Penang, Malaya around the same time as each-other, with the Ghadarites on-board being held by the British henceforth. After Nidhan's detainment in Malaya, he attempted to win-over the troops and getting weapons but he was unsuccessful. Nidhan Singh was part of a group of the Ghadarites that appealed to the governor of Malaya to allow the two boats to proceed to their destination, which was successful.

=== Return to Punjab ===
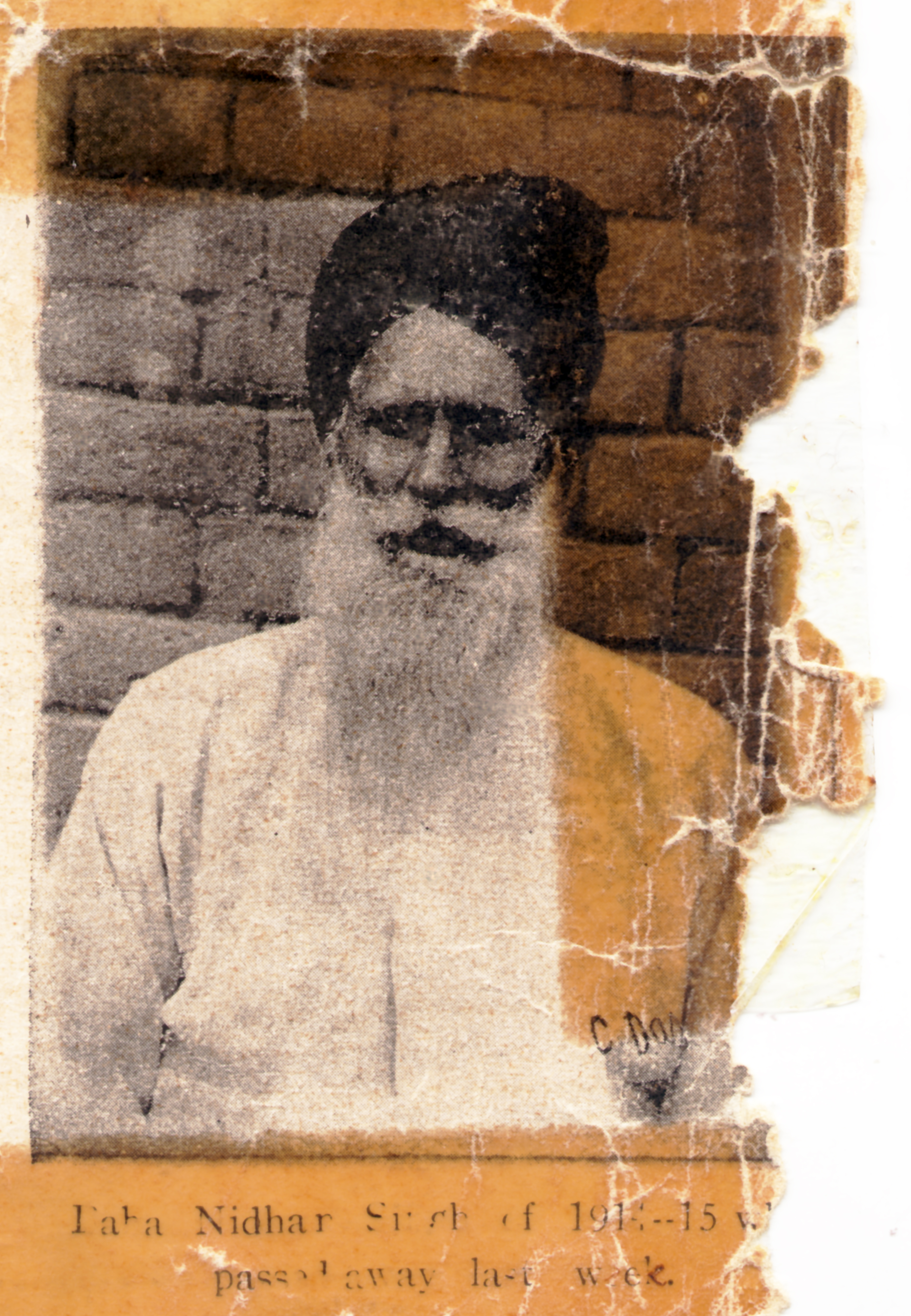
Nidhan Singh in his later years, ca.1930

Nidhan arrived in Ludhiana, Punjab on 7 November 1914, where he was assigned the task of creating an armed rebellion in the area. Thus, he set-forth having factories manufacture explosives like bombs for the insurrection. These bomb factories were located at Jhabewal and Lohat Baddi. A scheme was devised to launch a surprise attack on the Firozpur Cantonment on 30 November 1914 but it never materialized.

==== Arrest ====
Nidhan Singh, alongside Rur Singh of Chuhar Chak, was arrested by the British on 29 April 1915 whilst he was in incognito as a roaming mendicant. In the resulting first conspiracy case of Lahore, Nidhan Singh was sentenced to death. However, his death sentence was later commuted to penal transportation.

=== Later life ===
After serving his sentence, Nidhan Singh spent the rest of his years in Punjab and became respected as a religious man. Nidhan Singh formed part of the Panj Piare quintet that laid the foundation stone of the Harimandar at Panja Sahib on 14 October 1932. Nidhan Singh served as the president of both Gurdwara Lohgarh (Dina) and the Gurdwara Singh Sabha (Moga). Nidhan Singh died on 6 December 1936 in Moga.
