= Gurdwara Shanghai =

Sikh temple in Shanghai, China

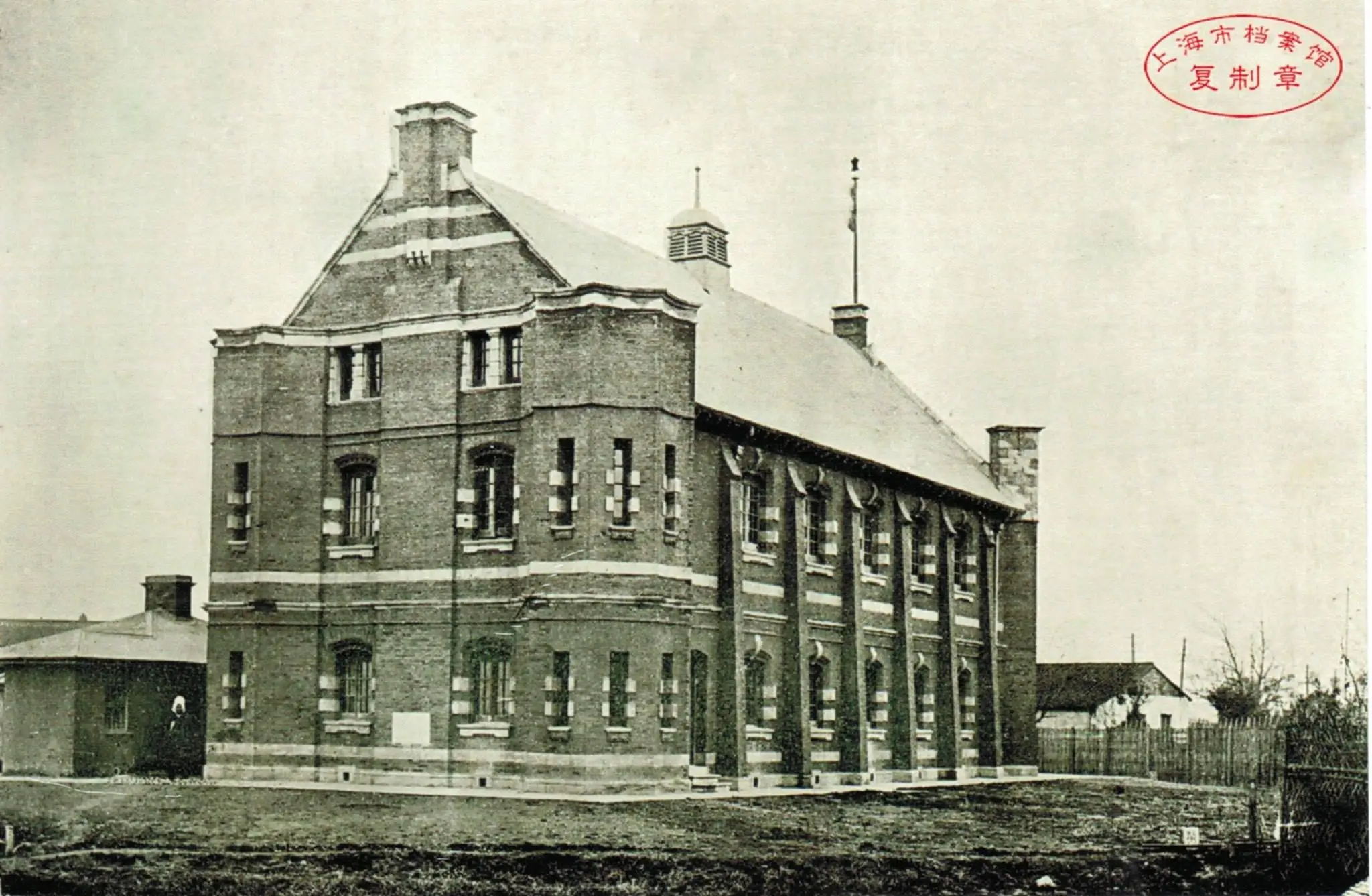
- 1908 Sikh Gurdwara in Shanghai showing Sikh flag 'Nishan Sahib' at the front
- Alternative names: Yindu Miao (印度庙); Dong Baoxing Road Gurdwara; North Szechuen Road Gurdwara

General information
- Status: Completed
- Type: Sikh temple
- Location: No. 326 Dongbaoxing Road, Hongkou District, Shanghai
- Coordinates: 31.25842°N 121.480685°E
- Opened: July 1908
- Affiliation: Sikhism

Technical details
- Floor area: 1,500 sq metres

Design and construction
- Architect: R. C. Turner
- Designations: Protected cultural relic

The Gurdwara Shanghai is the site of a former Sikh gurdwara in the Hongkou District of Shanghai, China and is a registered cultural relic.

== Names ==
The gurdwara had various names it was referred to as. One name was the 'Dong Baoxing Road Gurdwara'. Another name was the 'North Sichuan Road Gurdwara'. (Note: 'North Sichuan Road Gurdwara' is the modern-day spelling of 'Sichuan'. At the time, it would have been spelt as 'Szechuen' or 'Schezuan'.) The local Chinese referred to the gurdwara as Yindu Miao (Chinese: 印度庙, romanized: Yìndù miào, lit. 'Indian temple'). The gurdwara had the wording "Sikh Temple Shanghai" written on its wall during the time period of the Jaito Morcha.

== Location ==
The gurdwara was located on Tung Pao-hsing Road (now 326 Dong Bao Xing Lu; Dongbaoxing Lu). It was positioned one block to the west of the North Szechuen Road (Sichuan Bei Lu), and was next to the railway tracks leading to Woosung.

== History ==
=== Background ===
Prior to 1908, the gurdwara located on Boone Road (now Tonggu Road) in Shanghai served the needs of the Sikh community. However, during a Guru Nanak Gurpurab celebration in 1907, the local Sikhs decided to become affiliated with the Chief Khalsa Diwan based in Amritsar but the Boone Road gurdwara was too small to suit their needs and the growing Sikh population. Thus, it was decided that a new temple premises needed to be constructed. A committee, led by Jalmeja Singh, and gurdwara building fund was established for the effort of constructing a new, larger Sikh temple funded by donations from local Sikhs. The local Shanghai Sikhs had been desiring a larger gurdwara for several years and had been making requests to the community for donations and the Shanghai Municipal Council for land for the temple.

=== Construction ===
The Dong Baoxing Road Gurdwara's foundation stone was laid on Sunday, 11 August 1907, on land allotted by the Shanghai Municipal Council. A public works architect by the name of R. C. Turner assisted with the project.

It was built from 1907 to 1908 to meet the religious needs of Indian patrolmen and other Sikhs who had come over with the British. At the time of its construction, it was part of the Shanghai International Settlement, an area of Shanghai which was jointly administered by British and American authorities under a treaty with China.

=== Opening ===
The Old Sikh Gurdwara at 326 Dong Baoxing Road was opened in July 1908. The opening event was a large celebration. Hundreds of Sikh policemen and watchmen participated in the opening ceremony. A procession which started at Louza (Laoza) Police station, involved a town band and a decorated carriage carrying the Guru Granth Sahib. This procession was led by pious Sikhs and headed toward the new gurdwara that was located on the North Schezuan (Sichuan) Road extension. Once the procession arrived, the Guru Granth Sahib, which was attended upon by a granthi apprentice acting as a flywhisk attendant (the flywhisk was constructed out of horsehair), was placed upon the principal balcony of the edifice. The approach leading toward the new gurdwara building was lined with a guard of honour with fixed-bayonets. Non-Sikh, foreign guests attending the opening ceremony were instructed to not smoke tobacco and to remove their footwear before entering the temple. The guest-of-honour of the ceremony was Pelham Warren, who was the International Settlement’s Consul-General, whom gave a speech at the occasion. Another prominent figure who attended the opening ceremony was Captain E. I. M. Barrett, who was the superintendent of the Shanghai Sikh unit and other officials. These guests were awarded with garlands of flowers and jemadars offered their sword hilts as a sign of respect to Pelham Warren.

In the speech given by Pelham Warren at the opening ceremony, he expressed how there are both "good" and "bad" Sikhs. According to him, "good Sikhs" were ones who were loyal to the British Empire whilst "bad Sikhs" were aimless and damaging the reputation of the Sikh community. Meena Vathyam analyzes this as being a colonial divide-and-conquer trope commonly employed by the British in their colonies and settlements, in this case to control "Sikh disaffection". Local Sikhs who could be considered "good Sikhs" by their British overlords were promoted and rewarded, and became key members of the new gurdwara's managing committee.

=== Period as a gurdwara ===
The granthis (Sikh priests) who were active at the gurdwara were hired directly from India by the gurdwara committee. These granthis performed Sikh sacraments and also had the responsible acting as mediators in disputes within the Sikh community. The granthis of the gurdwara were endowed with a special Shanghai Police fund for the purposes of buying ghee (clarified butter) to prepare Punjabi food and light the lamps within the gurdwara premises. After collecting the fund, the granthi would forward it to the gurdwara's treasurer, where a senior Sikh policeman then would draw checks on the amount to place an order of ghee from Calcutta. 200 tin cans of ghee were ordered on a monthly basis for the gurdwara. After the ghee shipment arrived, a senior Sikh hawaldar would then open the shipment, brand the ghee products, divvy them up for all the police stations, and leave the remainder ghee tins to be sold by the gurdwara's granthi. A notable individual who worked as a treasurer for the gurdwara was Buddha Singh. Buddha Singh became the secretary in 1908.

In August 1909 on a Sunday, a Sikh residing in Shanghai by the name of Nidhan Singh married an ethnic Chinese woman at the Dongbaoxing Road gurdwara. The Chinese bride was a native of Pootung (Pudong), had a well-known desire to convert to Sikhism that was known to the Indian community, and she was very happy to be married. This Chinese woman converted to Sikhism and was baptized as Gursharan Kaur whilst her husband was baptized as Jagjit Singh in an Amrit Sanchar ceremony. The wedding ceremony itself was an Anand Karaj, where the bride was led by the groom four times in a circumabulation around the Guru Granth Sahib, with a bow given before the scripture after every revolution. A large amount of local Sikhs attended the interracial Sino-Sikh wedding, including 20 women. This was the first interracial Chinese-Sikh wedding to take place at the Dongbaoxing Road gurdwara.

The Shanghai Gurdwara became a centre of activity for the Ghadarites based in India and across the globe between the years 1913–17. Both pro-British and anti-British views occupied the same space of the gurdwara, leading to tensions within the Sikh community. Pro-British voices within the Sikh community began to be forced to silence out of fear of revenge attacks. Speeches given and literature produced by the Ghadarites promoted sedition against the British overlords. In 1915 during the Guru Nanak Gurpurab celebration, a pro-British speech was given at the Dong Baoxing Road Gurdwara in-which it was stated that true Sikhs are loyal to the British and rousing for anti-British Sikhs to be arrested. In July 1915, two Ghadarite Sikhs, Kesar Singh and Ganda Singh, attacked the secretary of the gurdwara, Boota Singh.

A new Sikh gurdwara, the Gordon Road Gurdwara, was opened on 21 July 1916 on a Friday. Both the newer Gordon Road and older Dong Baoxing Road gurdwaras were under the same management committee, however the latter came to be visited by watchmen and visitors whilst the former was used by Sikh policemen of the Shanghai police. The purpose of the British constructing the Gordon Road Gurdwara was to isolate Sikh policemen from Ghadarite elements at the Dong Baoxing Road Gurdwara by giving them a separate place of worship which was under the supervision of the Shanghai Municipal Council and restricted to policemen. Furthermore, the construction of the Gordon Road Gurdwara was a gesture of gratitude for the participation of Sikhs in World War I.

Compared to the newer Gordon Road Gurdwara, the Dong Baoxing Road Gurdwara was far more liberal and freely accessible, which led to non-Sikh Indians, such as Sindhis, also visiting it. Therefore the Dong Baoxing Road Gurdwara remained the primary temple of worship for the Shanghai Sikh community.

By 1917, the Ghadar movement in Shanghai was extinguished by the British and its Sikh supporters were executed by hanging or deported based on treason.

Buddha Singh, a highly-ranked officer (jemadar), was captain E. I. M. Barrett's informant on the happenings within the gurdwara, as the gurdwara commonly housed the impoverished, misfortunate, and travellers for free. In 1917, Buddha Singh was conferred the title of Sirdar Sahib by the Shanghai Municipal Police, and the Sikh Women's Association gifted him a gold Sikh emblem at the gurdwara. Many local Sikhs were angry at Buddha Singh, whom they characterized as a puppet of the British, believing he misappropriated the gurdwara's funds to brown-nose British officials with gifts.

Rabindranath Tagore visited Shanghai Gurdwara during his 1924 visit.

The Sikh community attending the gurdwara were divided based upon their ancestral Punjabi region of origin, with the principal groups in the local Sikh community namely being the Manjha and Malwa Sikhs. There was animosity existing between these two Sikh groups. A major brawl took place in August 1926 at the gurdwara, when the gurdwara's new working committee secretary could not be inducted. In the brawl, Manjha and Malwa Sikhs faced-off against each other using hatchets, pistols, battle-axe, and sticks. When Shanghai Municipal Police Detective Sergeant J. Knight arrived at the gurdwara due to the fight, he found both side 10 yards from one another. Each side claimed the first side to back down and leave were "losers". The incident led to the injuries of five Sikhs, including one who was hospitalized for a skull fracture. Due to this event, the gurdwara was temporarily closed and a guard was put-in-place.

The Vaisakhi spring-harvest festival was celebrated at the temple by the congregates. Sikh women carried out the task of decorating the premises of the temple during Vaisakhi. The Sikh ladies used hand-crafted embroidery for the occasion as decorations. Local Indian businesses would lend their silks to be used for the celebrations. Another popular celebration was the Singh Sabha cestival, which was organized by Buddha Singh, a high-ranking policeman.

There is evidence of ethnic Chinese visiting the Shanghai Gurdwara whilst it was active as a Sikh temple. An account of a Chinese woman who lived next door to the Sikh temple states she used to visit the gurdwara as a child and that Sikhs bringing a lot of milk would come.

In 1932, Indian hockey player Dhyan Chand visited the Dong Baoxing Road Gurdwara at a time when Chinese and Japanese forces were engaged in conflict in the city. In Chand's autobiography, Goal!, he records that the Sikh temple was heavily damaged in the fighting and that Japanese soldiers looked at him suspiciously when he left the gurdwara.

During the Second Sino-Japanese War, the building luckily survived bombings even though neighbouring structures were destroyed.

When Netaji Subhas Chandra Bose visited China, he was a guest-of-honour at the Dong Baoxing Road Gurdwara. Sikhs who were part of the Indian National Army in Shanghai worked in the area of and even inside the Dong Baoxing Road Gurdwara to mobilize volunteers and funds.

After the end of the Second World War in 1945, the Shanghai Municipal Police's Sikh unit was disbanded and many Sikhs returned to India or moved to Hong Kong or Singapore. The few Sikhs that remained continued to use the gurdwara for their religious purposes. In 1963, there were around 27 Sikhs in the city and most of them were engaged in the dairy industry. During the Cultural Revolution, three gurdwaras' presidents and compounds were apprehended by Chinese authorities and no form of compensation was given to the remaining Sikhs. In 1973, there were two Sikhs remaining: Gurmukh Singh and Kapul Singh, both of whom were dairy business owners. Gurmukh was using a room in the former Dong Baoxing Gurdwara as a place of residence and remarked that he had grown weary of feeling isolated. Gurmukh and Kapul left China by embarking for India from Hong Kong.

=== Present status ===
The gurdwara is a protected as a cultural relic and is under the supervision of the Hongkou District Government.It was designated as an "immovable cultural relic" on 16 December 2003.

The site is now a residence and serves as a community health clinic. It is now surrounded by high-rise complexes and the overhead Line 3 of the Shanghai Metro. It is home to six or seven Chinese families who have resided at the site for over four decades. Due to the former temple's current status as a residence for these families, preservation and restoration of the building is rendered difficult as it would involve relocation of current residents, there is also a lack of funds for any such effort. The current dwellers live in poor conditions and the building is decaying. There is a lack of privacy in current living arrangements for the dwellers as living quarters are only separated by thin cardboard. Some residents express a desire to move out for better conditions.

== Architecture ==
The structure originally occupied any area of 1,500 square metres. The gurdwara faced south and was a two-story, rectangular-shaped building. Red bricks were used for the walls of the edifice. There were 19 stairs leading up to the entrance, with each stair being 2 metres in width. The entrance doorway leading into the interior of the site was arched and wooden. Three to four metres from the entranceway, there were two further arched doors. The temple had a large hall with a holy rostrum located at the centre positioned in the rear. Windows that were small and long were positioned on both sides of the sidewalls.The downstairs floor was used as an administrative office.

== Gallery ==
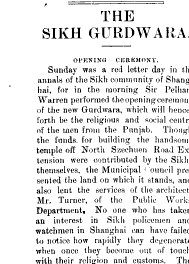
'North China Herald' newspaper snippet about the opening ceremony of Gurdwara Shanghai on Tung Pao-hsing Road in Shanghai, China, 1908

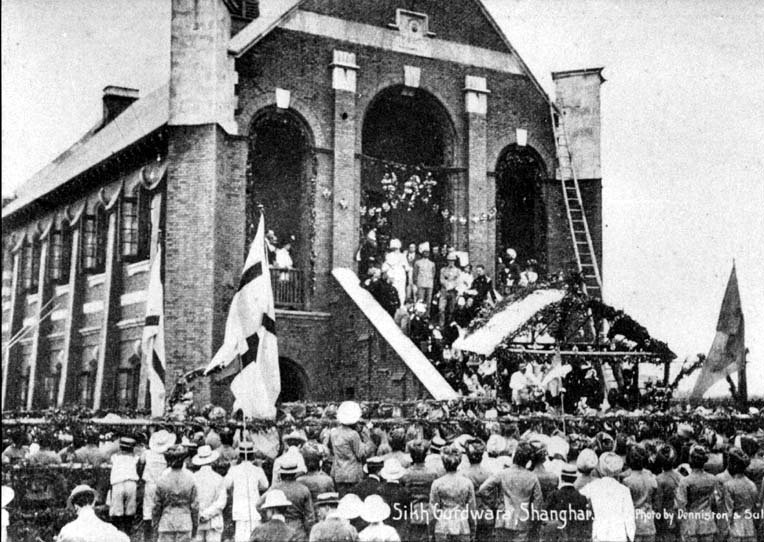
Inauguration in 1908 of the Sikh Gurdwara in Shanghai

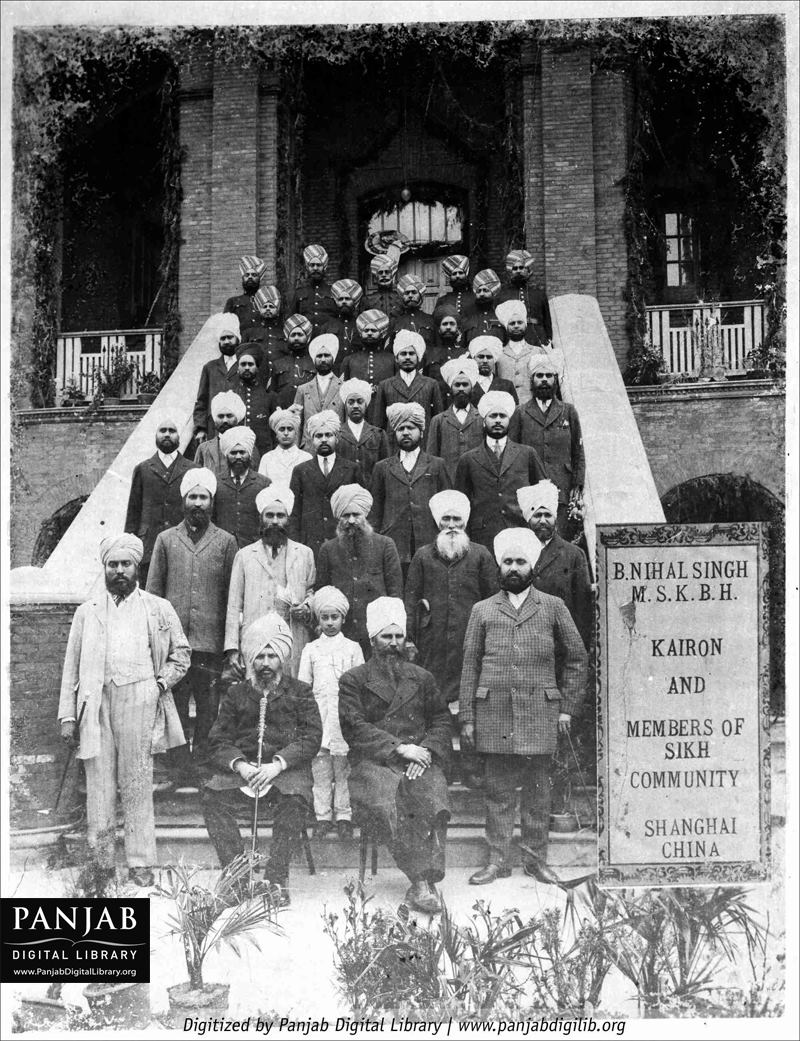
Nihal Singh Kairon and local Sikhs in-front of the Dongbaoxing Road Gurdwara, Shanghai, ca.1914

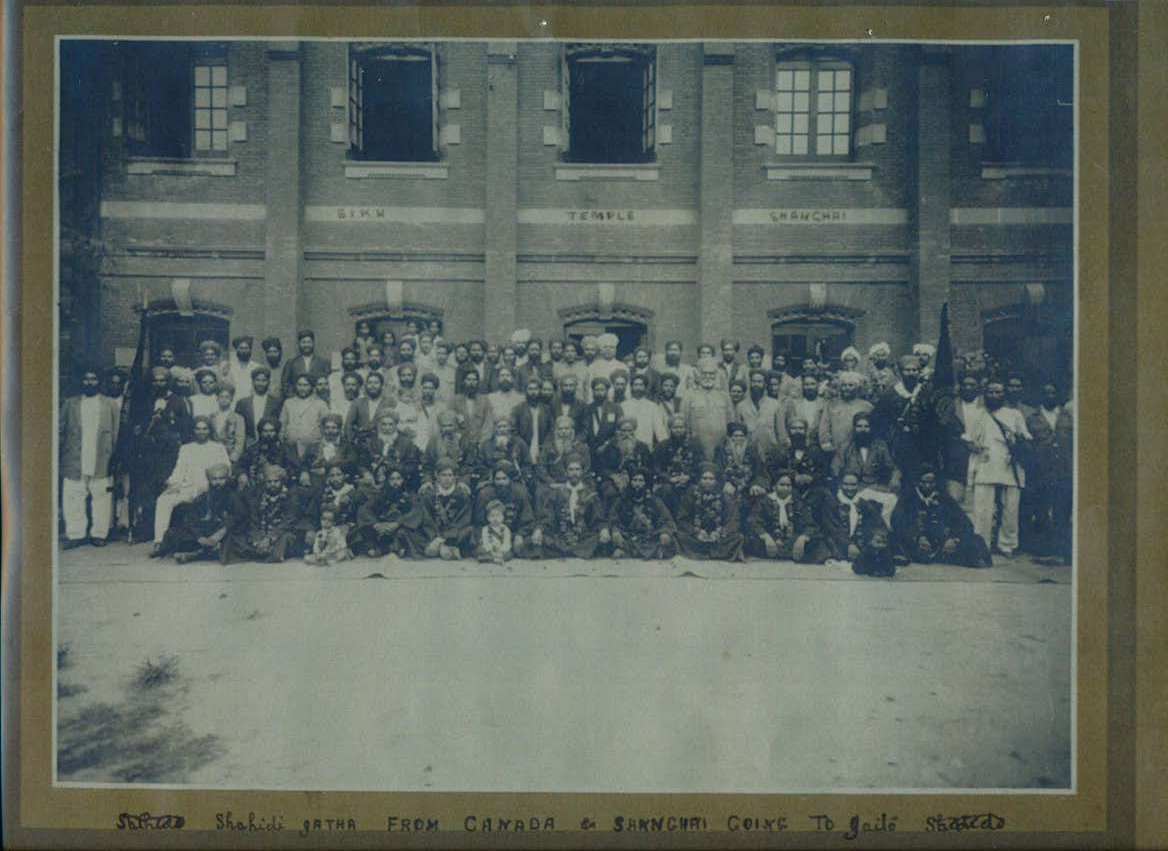
Combination of Canada-based and China-based Sikhs forming a Shaheedi Jatha for the Jaito Morcha posing in-front of Dongbaoxing Road Gurdwara, Shanghai, ca.1924–25

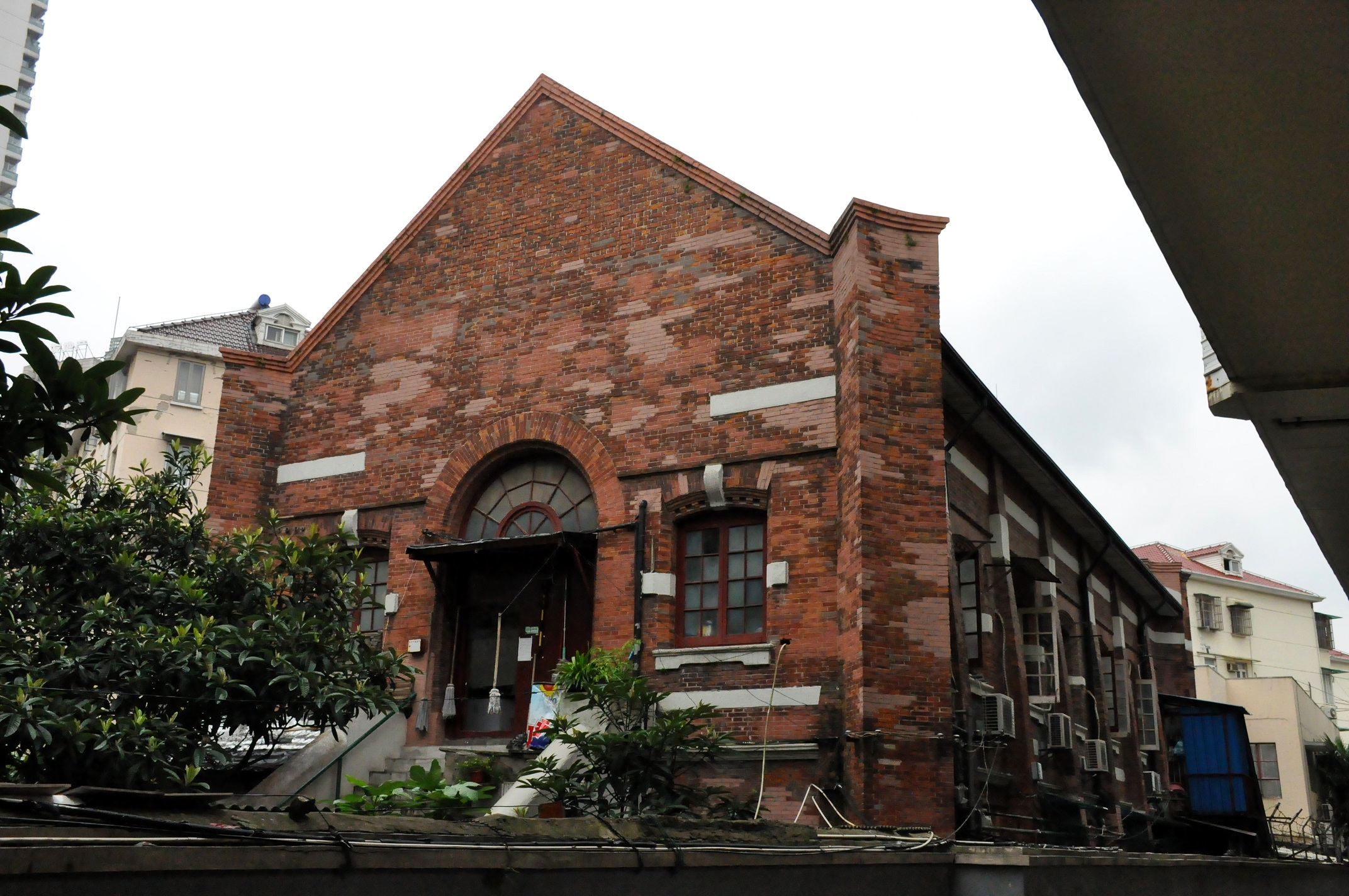
Bauxing Road Gurdwara Monument for Sikhism heritage in China, 2015

== See also ==
- Sikhism in China
