= UP Aerospace =

American private spaceflight firm

UP Aerospace, Inc.
- Type: Private
- Industry: Aerospace
- Founded: 2004
- Headquarters: Denver, Colorado
- Key people: Jerry Larson, President
- Website: Official website

UP Aerospace, Inc. is a private spaceflight corporation headquartered in Denver, Colorado. UP Aerospace provides sub-orbital transportation for corporate, military and educational payloads, via their SpaceLoft XL sounding rocket launch vehicles.

== History and future plans ==
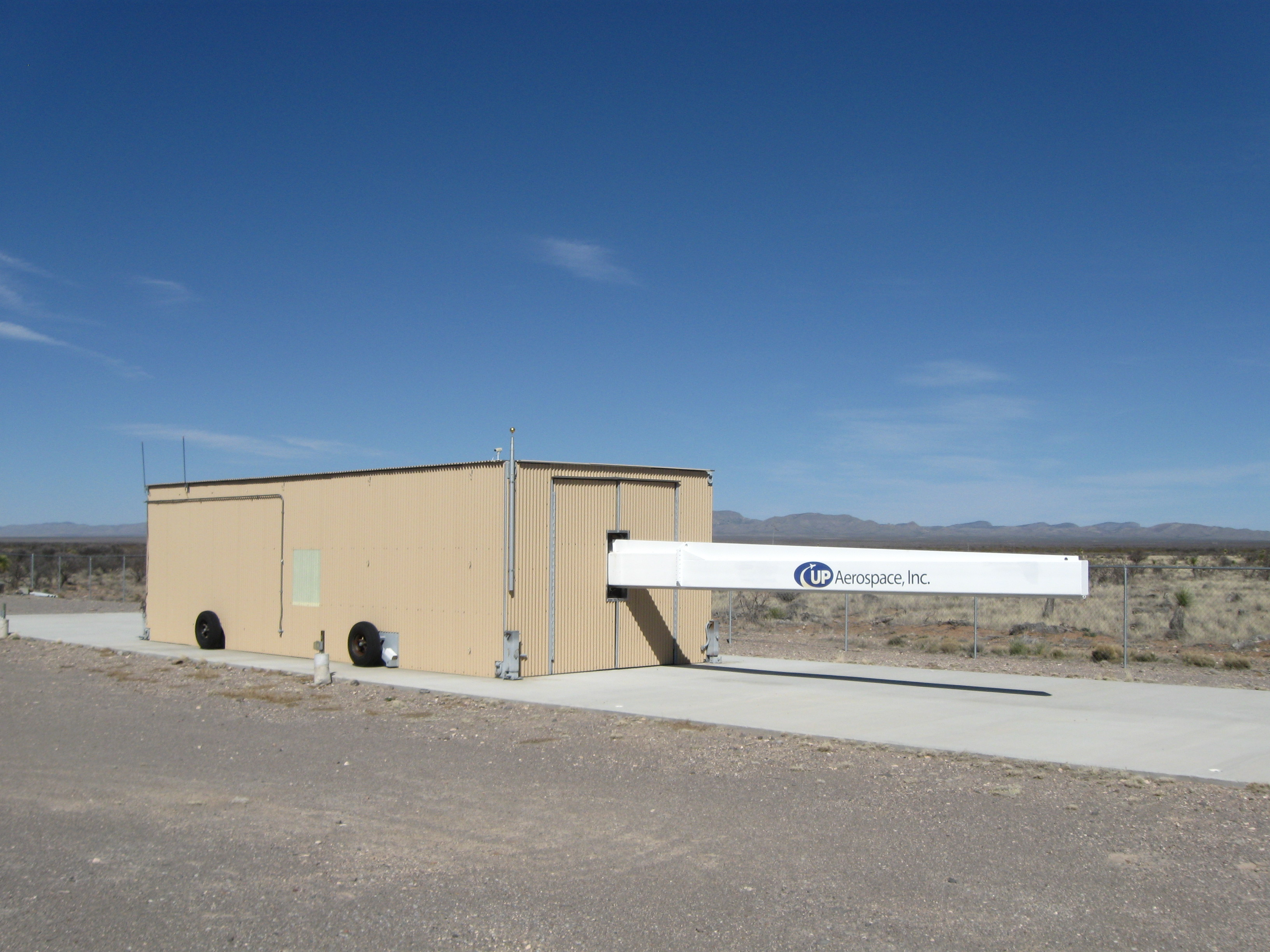
UP Aerospace vertical launch site at Spaceport America

UP Aerospace was started in 1998 by Jerry Larson, an aerospace engineer who had long been involved in the space program as an employee of Lockheed Martin. Larson was also a member of the Civilian Space eXploration Team (CSXT), which in 2004 became the first amateur organization to launch a (suborbital) rocket into space. The company was incorporated in 2004.

The first launch of the SpaceLoft XL occurred on September 25, 2006, from Spaceport America in Upham, New Mexico. The vehicle failed to go higher than 40,000 ft due to a malfunction attributed to faulty fin design and unexpected aerodynamic effects.

UP Aerospace conducted eight launches from Spaceport America during 2006–2009, including three in 2009. They plan to "double the number of customer launches from Spaceport America to six or more in 2010 as demand for the company's services increases."

As of November 2015 the company is developing an orbital small satellite launch vehicle known as Spyder, with support from NASA.

On July 31, 2018, UP Aerospace announced it had been awarded a 5-year IDIQ launch contract by NASA under Flight Opportunities Program. The contract calls for UP Aerospace to conduct suborbital rocket flights for NASA using its SpaceLoft XL rocket. This was the third contract of this type awarded to UP Aerospace by NASA. UP Aerospace had conducted, up to 31 July 2018, 7 launches for NASA under the Flight Opportunities program since 2012.

== Launches ==
=== Completed Launches ===
As of 23 November 2019, UP Aerospace has made 18 launches, including 13 with the SpaceLoft XL rocket. Most launches have been successful. All launches have been suborbital and all launches have taken place from Spaceport America.

Maiden launch of SpaceLoft XL took place on 25 September 2006.

On April 28, 2007, some of the cremated remains of actor James Doohan, who played Chief Engineer Scott on the 1960s television series Star Trek, and from astronaut Gordon Cooper, were rocketed into suborbital space (along with ashes of about 200 other people) by UP Aerospace from Spaceport America. This was the first successful launch from the site. The payload container was recovered 18 May 2007.

By August 2007, UP Aerospace began offering low-cost launches to youth and students through the Space Generation Advisory Council for as low as US$2,000 per experiment. From 2008, the Space Generation Advisory Council hosted a range of competitions for youth to address specific technical or logistical challenges through the design of their own UP Aerospace TinySat module.

In April 2008, UP Aerospace was hired by the large US aerospace company Lockheed Martin to provide launch services at Spaceport America for a test rocket program. Lockheed Martin stated that they are trying to create a lower-cost-to-orbit cargo service, using a winged vehicle launched atop a land-based rocket. UP Aerospace and the New Mexico location were chosen to aid in testing prototype systems. UP Aerospace was chosen, particularly, because of their experience launching rockets at Spaceport America.

UP Aerospace conducted their 6th sub-orbital launch on April 5, 2012. Called SpaceLoft 6, it was contracted by the Department of Defense (ORS) office. The vehicle also carried on board an experiment from NASA's Flight Opportunities Program. The Spaceloft XL rocket launch set a new Spaceport America record at the time, reaching an altitude of 385,640 feet.

UP Aerospace SL-7 launch took place on June 21, 2013. The vehicle carried 7 payloads for NASA's Flight Opportunities Program and the cremated remains for 39 individuals. This successful flight reached an altitude of 73.9 miles. All payloads were recovered on White Sands Range.

UP Aerospace SL-8 launch on November 12 took place at Spaceport America and reached 385,000 feet. On board were experiments sponsored by NASA's Flight Opportunities Program. Brian Barnett, Satwest President, led a team of Albuquerque students that sent the first commercial text messages to space using a Satwest satellite phone inside one of eight payloads carried by the SL-8. This technology has later been incorporated into Solstar Space. SpaceLoft XL 8 was the second fully manifested launch for the Flight Opportunities Program.

UP Aerospace SL-9 took place at Spaceport America on October 23, 2014. After a 3-day weather hold, the rocket was launched reaching 408,035 feet (77.25 miles). The NASA Flight Opportunities supported Launch Carried 4 Technology Payloads. Also on board were cremations of 30 individuals provided through Celestis memorial spaceflights as well as an experiment from a private company.

UP Aerospace SL-10 mission launched on November 6, 2015, from Spaceport America. The SpaceLoft XL suborbital sounding rocket carried four technology experiments for NASA's Flight Opportunities Program to an altitude of approximately 75 miles (120 km). For the first time for UP Aerospace the payload experiments were separated from the rocket for an independent re-entry and were recovered 30 miles downrange after parachuting down individually.

UP Aerospace SL-12 mission launched on September 12, 2018, from Spaceport America. The SpaceLoft XL suborbital sounding rocket carried three technology demonstration payloads for NASA's Flight Opportunities Program. The payloads were an umbrella-like heat shield called Adaptable Deployable Entry and Placement Technology (ADEPT), the Suborbital Flight Environment Monitor (SFEM-3) and the Autonomous Flight Termination System (AFTS). Reached an altitude of 114 km (70.84 miles).

UP Aerospace SL-11 mission was launched on September 17, 2018, from Spaceport America, just five days after the previous flight. The SpaceLoft XL suborbital sounding rocket carried technology demonstration payloads for NASA's Flight Opportunities Program. Also on-board was Celestis-15 Starseeker. Reached an altitude of 114 km (70.84 miles).

UP Aerospace SL-14 mission was launched on November 22, 2019, from Spaceport America. The SpaceLoft XL suborbital sounding rocket carried payloads for NASA's Flight Opportunities Program. Reached an altitude of 92 km (57 mi).

=== Future Launches ===
UP Aerospace has plans for future launches with a number of their clients.

On November 29, 2022, it was announced that they would be flying Celestis' 19th mission. They are using the SpaceLoft XL suborbital sounding rocket as the vehicle. A launch is planned to take place Wednesday, November 30, 2022; however, it was scrubbed Tuesday night with plans to launch Thursday, December 1, 2022, instead. As of 10 January 2023, the launch has not happened.

=== Table of Launches Completed and Future ===
Launch	Date (UTC)	Vehicle	Payload	Launch pad	Result	Remarks
1	SL-1 September 25, 2006	SpaceLoft XL	Various	UA launch tower	Failure	The [unsuccessful] maiden launch of a SpaceLoft XL rocket by UP Aerospace. It veered off course and lost control shortly after lift-off.
2	SL-2 April 28, 2007	SpaceLoft XL	Celestis-06 Legacy and other payloads	UA launch tower	Success	The first successful launch, a second Spaceloft XL, primarily carried cremated human remains, including those of astronaut Gordon Cooper and Star Trek actor James Doohan.
3	December 19, 2007	Proprietary test vehicle	Technology Demonstration	UA launch tower	Success	Low-altitude atmospheric test flight not intended to reach space. Reached a maximum altitude of 2,500 feet.
4	December 2007	Space plane prototype	None	UA launch tower	Success	Proprietary technology launch for Lockheed Martin.
5	August 12, 2008	Space plane prototype	None	UA launch tower	Success (Spaceport America & UP Aerospace view) Anomalous (Lockheed-Martin view)	Proprietary technology launch for Lockheed Martin.
6	SL-3 May 2, 2009	SpaceLoft XL	New Mexico student payloads Celestis-08 Discovery	UA launch tower	Anomalous	"Education opportunity for New Mexico students to design experiments that use the environment of suborbital space to answer scientific and engineering questions". The craft failed to reach space.
7	August 4, 2009	Black Watch	ground-launched UAV prototype	UA launch tower	Success	Test flight launch for Florida-based Moog-FTS.
8	10 October 2009	"reusable rocket plane"	Lockheed proprietary payload	UA launch tower	Success	Test of "proprietary advanced launch technologies" for Lockheed Martin.
9	SL-4 May 4, 2010	SpaceLoft XL	Various, Celestis-09 Pioneer	UA launch tower	Success	UP Aerospace successfully launched the 4th SpaceLoft Rocket 70 miles into space. The vehicle spent four minutes in the weightlessness of space before landing on the neighboring White Sands Missile Range.
10	SL-5 May 20, 2011	SpaceLoft XL	Various, Celestis-10 Goddard	UA launch tower	Success	The vehicle performed a flawless mission reaching a Spaceport America record setting altitude of 73.5 miles (118 km) into space.
11	SL-6 April 5, 2012	SpaceLoft XL	Various	UA launch tower	Success	Included first launch of experimental payloads for NASA's Flight Opportunities Program, and Department of Defense experiments.
12	SL-7 June 21, 2013	SpaceLoft XL	NASA (Flight Opportunities Program), Celestis-12 Centennial	UA launch tower	Success	First fully manifested launch for NASA's Flight Opportunities Program. Set new Spaceport America altitude record of 73.9 miles.
13	SL-8 November 12, 2013	SpaceLoft XL	NASA (Flight Opportunities Program)	UA launch tower	Success	Second fully manifested launch for NASA's Flight Opportunities Program. Reached altitude of 384,100 feet (72.75 miles).
14	SL-9 October 23, 2014	SpaceLoft XL	NASA (Flight Opportunities Program), Celestis-13 Conestoga	UA launch tower	Success	Third fully manifested launch for NASA's Flight Opportunities Program. Set new Spaceport America altitude record of 408,035 feet (124.369 km/77.25 miles).
15	SL-10 November 6, 2015	SpaceLoft XL	NASA (Flight Opportunities Program), Celestis-14 Tribute	UA launch tower	Success	First private sounding rocket to demonstrate ejection of independently recovered payloads. Reached an altitude of 120.7 km (74.98 miles).
16	SL-12 September 12, 2018	SpaceLoft XL	NASA (Flight Opportunities Program)	UA launch tower	Success	Three NASA technology demonstration payloads launched, an umbrella-like heat shield called Adaptable Deployable Entry and Placement Technology (ADEPT), the Suborbital Flight Environment Monitor (SFEM-3) and the Autonomous Flight Termination System (AFTS). Reached an altitude of 114 km (70.84 miles).
17	SL-11 September 17, 2018	SpaceLoft XL	NASA (Flight Opportunities Program), Celestis-15 Starseeker	UA launch tower	Success	Sixth fully manifested launch for NASA's Flight Opportunities Program and Celestis-Mission Starseeker. Reached an altitude of 114 km (70.84 miles).
18	SL-14 November 22, 2019 15:19	SpaceLoft XL	NASA FOP-7 (Flight Opportunities Program-7), ADS-B experiment	UA launch tower	Success	Seventh launch for NASA's Flight Opportunities Program. Reached an altitude of 92 kilometres (57 mi).
19	SL-16 August 11, 2021 14:44	SpaceLoft XL	ReDX-1	UA launch tower	Success	ReDX-1 mission for the Los Alamos National Laboratory. Reached an altitude of 100 kilometres (62 mi).
20	SL-17 May 1, 2023 16:45	SpaceLoft XL	NASA FOP-8 (Flight Opportunities Program-8), Celestis-18 Aurora	UA launch tower	Failure	Celestis' mission included a memorial for Philip Kenyon Chapman, an Australian-American astronaut and scientist. NASA's FOP-8 consisted of 13 payloads selected from the NASA's TechRise Student Challenge. The rocket exploded moments after liftoff.
21	SL-15 October 1, 2024 13:09	SpaceLoft XL	NASA FOP-9 (Flight Opportunities Program-9), ADS-B experiment	UA launch tower	Success	Ninth launch for NASA's Flight Opportunities Program. Reached an altitude of 100 kilometres (57 mi).
22	SL-20 8 November 2024	SpaceLoft XL	Cyclone-1, Technology demonstration, Los Alamos National Laboratory	Spaceport America	Success	After reaching apogee, a research payload was released and monitored by Laboratory scientists throughout its descent back to the Earth.
23	13 June 2025	Spyder-1	None	White Sands LC-36	Success	Test flight of a single stage hypersonic demonstrator of the Spyder launch vehicle

== Products ==
- SpaceLoft XL sounding rocket
