= SpaceLoft XL =

American sounding rocket

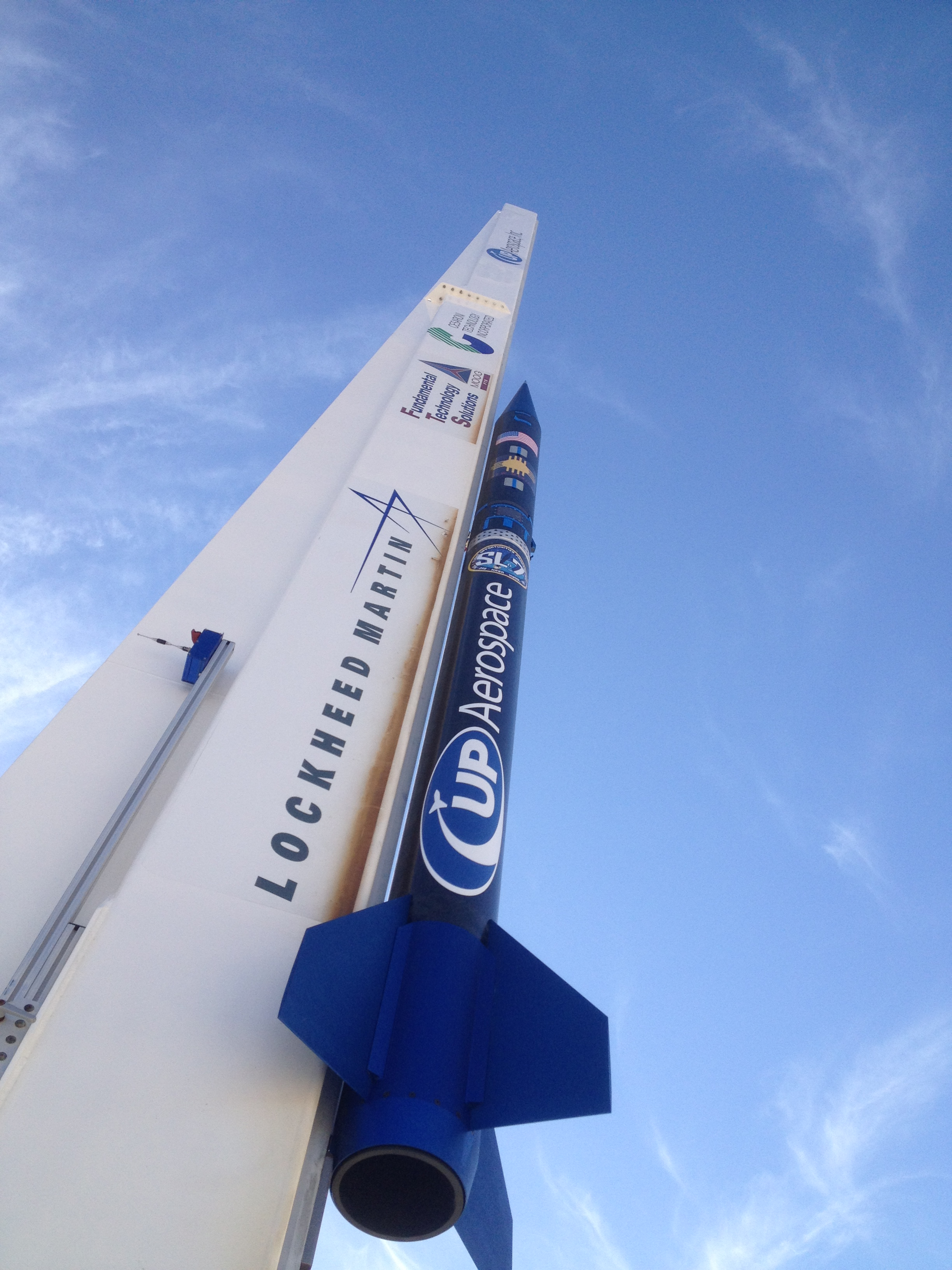
- Spaceloft XL flight SL-7 on the launch tower at Spaceport America
- Function: Sounding rocket
- Manufacturer: UP Aerospace
- Country of origin: United States

Size
- Height: 20 ft (6 m)
- Diameter: 10.45 in (26.5 cm)
- Mass: 780 lb (354.5 kg)
- Stages: 1

Capacity
- Payload to Sub-orbital 71.5 miles (115 km) apogee: 79 lb (36 kg)

Launch history
- Status: Active
- Launch sites: Spaceport America
- Total launches: 15
- Success(es): 12
- Failure: 3
- First flight: 25 September 2006

First stage
- Engines: 1 solid
- Thrust: 8240 lbf (36.6kN)
- Burn time: 12 seconds
- Propellant: solid

The SpaceLoft XL is a sounding rocket developed by private spaceflight company UP Aerospace. The rocket is capable of lofting a 79 lb (36 kg) payload to a sub-orbital trajectory with an apogee of about 71.5 miles (115 km). It travels for approximately 60 seconds to cross the Kármán line (the official "edge of space" at 100 km). All launches are sub-orbital and do not complete one orbital revolution. Launches are conducted from the company launch facility at Spaceport America in Upham, New Mexico.

== Description ==
The rocket is 20 feet (6 m) long and 10 inches (25 cm) in diameter, and consists of a single stage powered by a single solid fuel rocket engine. Typical flights last about 13 minutes, with more than 4 minutes of weightlessness. The rocket is reportedly capable of reaching up to 225 km (140 miles) altitude, though its standard apogee is closer to 115 km (71 miles).

Cost and time requirements for SpaceLoft XL launch are demonstrated in a 2021 suborbital mission contracted by Los Alamos National Laboratory, with costs at $1 million and an 11 month timeline from contract signing to flight (15 months from concept to flight).

== Launches ==
The first launch, SL-1 was made at 2:14 p.m. local time (20:14 UTC) on September 25, 2006, from Spaceport America. During its maiden flight, it experienced an "unexpected aerodynamic effect" and crashed in the New Mexico desert after reaching only 40,000 feet (12 km).

The second launch, SL-2 originally scheduled for October 21, 2006, was successfully carried out on April 28, 2007, at 8:56 a.m. local time (14:56 UTC). UP Aerospace president Jerry Larson had said the rocket was assembled and had been on the launch rail since Tuesday (24 April). The primary payload, Celestis Legacy, consisted of cremated human remains including those of astronaut Gordon Cooper and Star Trek actor James Doohan, whose ashes were also on board the ill-fated Falcon 1 when it malfunctioned in August 2008.

As of 2 May 2023, UP Aerospace has conducted a total of 20 launches, including 15 with SpaceLoft XL rockets, most of which have been successful. The third launch of SpaceLoft XL, which was conducted at 14:00 UTC on 2 May 2009, carrying student experiments and the Discovery payload for Celestis, had an electronic anomaly causing an early separation and failed to reach the correct apogee. To date, the highest altitude achieved by the SpaceLoft XL rocket was reached by SL-9, which set a Spaceport America altitude record of 77.25 miles (124 km) on October 23, 2014.

The flight of May 1, 2023 carrying NASA's FOP-8 (Flight Opportunities Program-8) and Celestis-18 Aurora payloads failed. Celestis' mission included a memorial for Philip Kenyon Chapman, an Australian-American astronaut and scientist. NASA's FOP-8 consisted of 13 payloads selected from the NASA's TechRise Student Challenge. The rocket exploded moments after liftoff.

== See also ==
- Sounding rocket
- List of UP Aerospace launches
- Black Brant rocket
- Skylark (rocket)
