= Upham, New Mexico =

Unincorporated community in New Mexico, United States

Upham
- Unincorporated community
- Location within New Mexico
- Coordinates: 32°53′11″N 107°00′08″W
- Country: United States
- State: New Mexico
- County: Sierra
- Elevation: 4,561 ft (1,390 m)
- GNIS feature ID: 899972

Upham (/ˈjuːˌfəm/ YOO-fum) is an inhabited, unincorporated community and place in Sierra County, New Mexico, United States. It has gained recognition for being near the site for the Spaceport America facility being developed by the New Mexico Spaceport Authority. This will be Virgin Galactic's world headquarters and mission control location.

Upham is located approximately 30 miles east of Truth or Consequences, and 45 miles north of Las Cruces, in the southern part of the state 4,557 feet (1,389 meters) above sea level. Virgin Galactic is the first space tourism company to develop commercial flights into space.

Sub-orbital commercial space launches began in 2007.

== Education ==
Truth or Consequences Municipal Schools is the school district for the entire county. Truth or Consequences Middle School and Hot Springs High School, both in Truth or Consequences, are the district's secondary schools.
