= Gordon Cooper =

American astronaut (1927–2004)

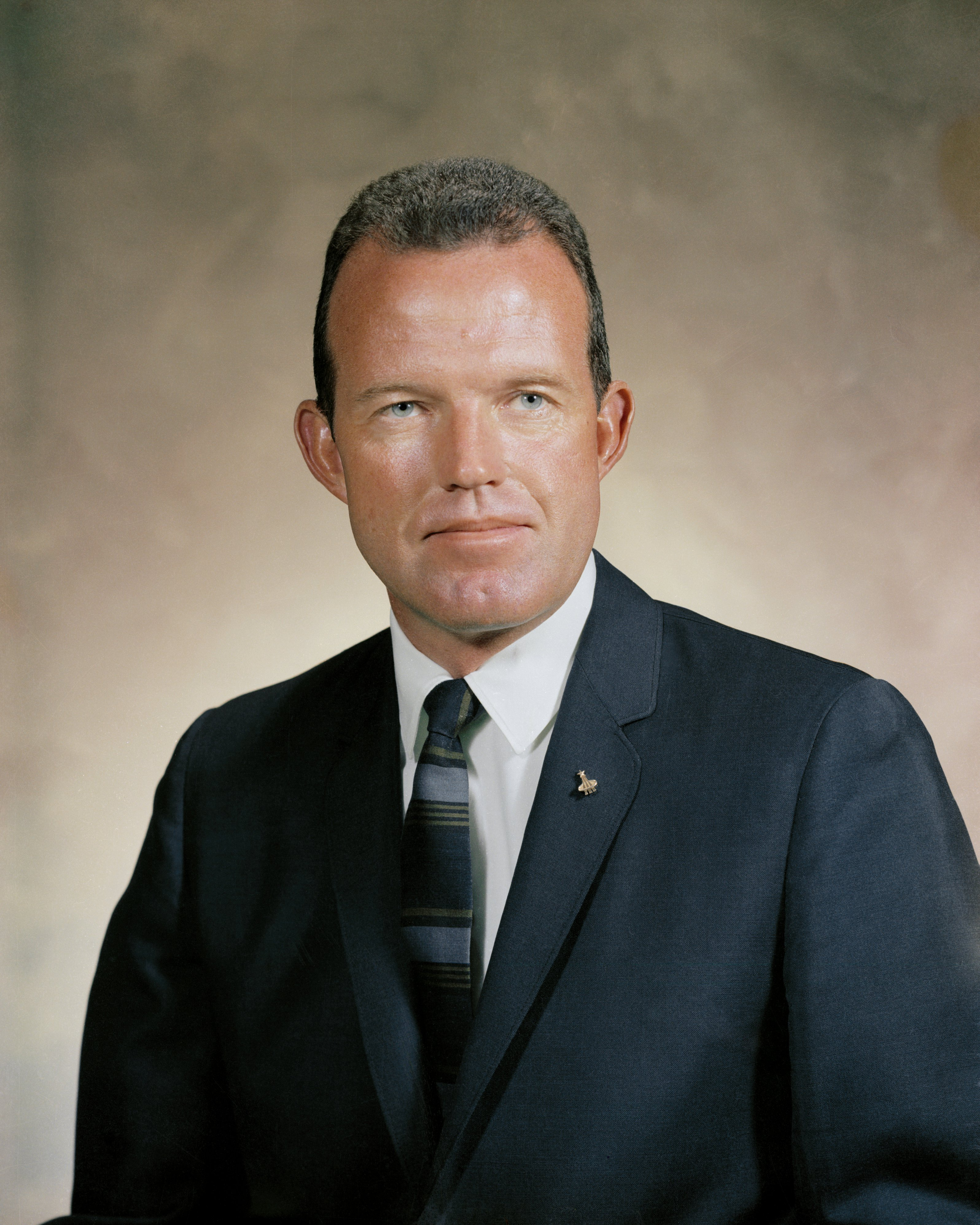
- Cooper in 1964
- Born: Leroy Gordon Cooper Jr. March 6, 1927; Shawnee, Oklahoma, U.S.
- Died: October 4, 2004 (aged 77); Ventura, California, U.S.
- Education: University of Hawaiʻi at Mānoa; University of Maryland, College Park; Air University (BS)
- Spouses: Trudy B. Olson (m. 1947; div. 1970) Suzan Taylor (m. 1972)
- Children: 4
- Awards: Legion of Merit; Distinguished Flying Cross (2); NASA Distinguished Service Medal; NASA Exceptional Service Medal
- Space career

NASA astronaut
- Rank: Colonel, USAF
- Time in space: 9d 9h 14m
- Selection: NASA Group 1 (1959)
- Mission: Mercury-Atlas 9 Gemini 5
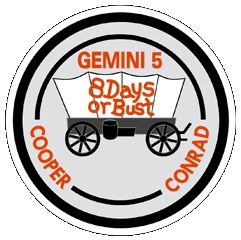
- Mission insignia
- Retired: July 31, 1970

Leroy Gordon Cooper Jr. (March 6, 1927 – October 4, 2004) was an American aerospace engineer, test pilot, United States Air Force pilot, and the youngest of the seven original astronauts in Project Mercury, the first human space program of the United States. Cooper learned to fly as a child, and after service in the United States Marine Corps during World War II, he was commissioned into the United States Air Force in 1949. After serving as a fighter pilot, he qualified as a test pilot in 1956 and was selected as an astronaut in 1959.

In 1963, Cooper piloted the longest and last Mercury spaceflight, Mercury-Atlas 9. During that 34-hour mission, he became the first American to spend an entire day in space, the first to sleep in space, and the last American launched on an entirely solo orbital mission. Despite a series of severe equipment failures, he completed the mission under manual control, guiding his spacecraft, which he named Faith 7, to a splashdown just 6.4 kilometres (4 mi) ahead of the recovery ship. Cooper became the first person to make a second orbital flight when he flew as command pilot of Gemini 5 in 1965. Along with pilot Pete Conrad, he set a new space endurance record by traveling 5,331,745 kilometres (3,312,993 mi) in 190 hours and 56 minutes—just short of eight days—showing that astronauts could survive in space for the length of time necessary to go from the Earth to the Moon and back.

Cooper liked to race cars and boats, and entered the $28,000 Salton City 500 miles (800 km) boat race, the Southwest Championship Drag Boat races in 1965, and the 1967 Orange Bowl Regatta with firefighter Red Adair. In 1968, he entered the 24 Hours of Daytona, but NASA management ordered him to withdraw due to the dangers involved. After serving as backup commander of the Apollo 10 mission, he was superseded by Alan Shepard. He retired from NASA and the Air Force with the rank of colonel in 1970.

== Early life and education ==
Leroy Gordon Cooper Jr. was born on March 6, 1927, in Shawnee, Oklahoma, the only child of Leroy Gordon Cooper Sr. and his wife, Hattie Lee née Herd. His father enlisted in the United States Navy during World War I. After the war, Cooper Sr. completed high school; Hattie Lee was one of the teachers, although she was only two years older. Cooper Sr. joined the Oklahoma National Guard, where he flew a Curtiss JN-4 biplane, graduated from law school, and became a state district judge. After active service in World War II, he transferred to United States Air Force (USAF) when it was formed in 1947, and was stationed at Hickam Air Force Base, Hawaii Territory.

Cooper attended Jefferson Elementary School and Shawnee High School, where he was on the football and track teams. During his senior year in high school, he played halfback on the football team that played in the state football championship. He was active in the Boy Scouts of America, where he achieved its second highest rank, Life Scout. His parents owned a Command-Aire 3C3 biplane, and he learned to fly at a young age. His father sat him on cushions so he could see and rigged the rudder pedals with blocks so he could reach them. He unofficially soloed when he was 12 years old, and earned his pilot license in a Piper J-3 Cub when he was 16. His family moved to Murray, Kentucky, when his father was called back into service, and he graduated from Murray High School in June 1945.

After Cooper learned that the United States Army and Navy flying schools were not taking any more candidates, he enlisted in the United States Marine Corps. He left for Parris Island as soon as he graduated from high school, declining a football scholarship to Oklahoma A&M. World War II ended before he saw overseas service. He was assigned to the Naval Academy Preparatory School (NAPS) and was an alternate appointee to the United States Naval Academy (USNA) but was not appointed. After graduating from NAPS, he served with the Presidential Honor Guard in Washington, D.C. until he was discharged from the Marine Corps in 1946.

Following his discharge from the Marine Corps, Cooper went to Hawaii to live with his parents. He started attending the University of Hawaiʻi at Mānoa, and bought his own J-3 Cub. There he met his first wife, Trudy B. Olson (1927–1994) of Seattle, through the local flying club. She was active in flying and later became the only wife of a Mercury Seven astronaut to have a private pilot license. They were married on August 29, 1947, in Honolulu, when both were 20 years old. They had two daughters.

== Military service ==
At college, Cooper was active in the Reserve Officers' Training Corps (ROTC), which led to his being commissioned as a second lieutenant in the U.S. Army in June 1949. He was able to transfer his commission to the United States Air Force in September. He received flight training at Perrin Air Force Base, Texas and Williams Air Force Base, Arizona, in the T-6 Texan.

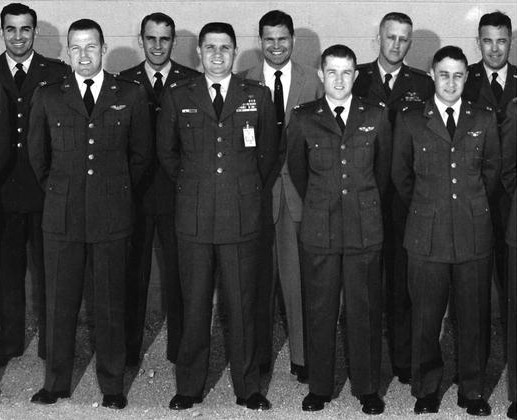
USAF Experimental Flight Test School Class 56D, April 1957. Front row: Captains Gordon Cooper, James Wood, Jack Mayo, and Gus Grissom.

On completion of his flight training in 1950, Cooper was posted to Neubiberg Air Base in West Germany, where he flew F-84 Thunderjets and F-86 Sabres for four years. He became a flight commander of the 525th Fighter Bomber Squadron. While in Germany, he attended the European Extension of the University of Maryland. He returned to the United States in 1954, and studied for two years at the U.S. Air Force Institute of Technology (AFIT) in Ohio of Air University. He completed his Bachelor of Science degree in Aerospace Engineering there on August 28, 1956.

While at AFIT, Cooper met Gus Grissom, a fellow USAF officer, and the two became good friends. They were involved in an accident on takeoff from Lowry Field on June 23, 1956, when the Lockheed T-33 Cooper was piloting suddenly lost power. He aborted the takeoff, but the landing gear collapsed. The aircraft skidded erratically for 610 metres (2,000 ft), and crashed at the end of the runway, bursting into flames. Cooper and Grissom escaped unscathed, although the aircraft was a total loss.

Cooper and Grissom attended the USAF Experimental Flight Test Pilot School (Class 56D) at Edwards Air Force Base in California in 1956. After graduation Cooper was posted to the Flight Test Engineering Division at Edwards, where he served as a test pilot and project manager testing the F-102A and F-106B. He also flew the T-28, T-37, F-86, F-100 and F-104. By the time he left Edwards, he had logged more than 2,000 hours of flight time, of which 1,600 hours were in jet aircraft.

== NASA career ==
=== Project Mercury ===
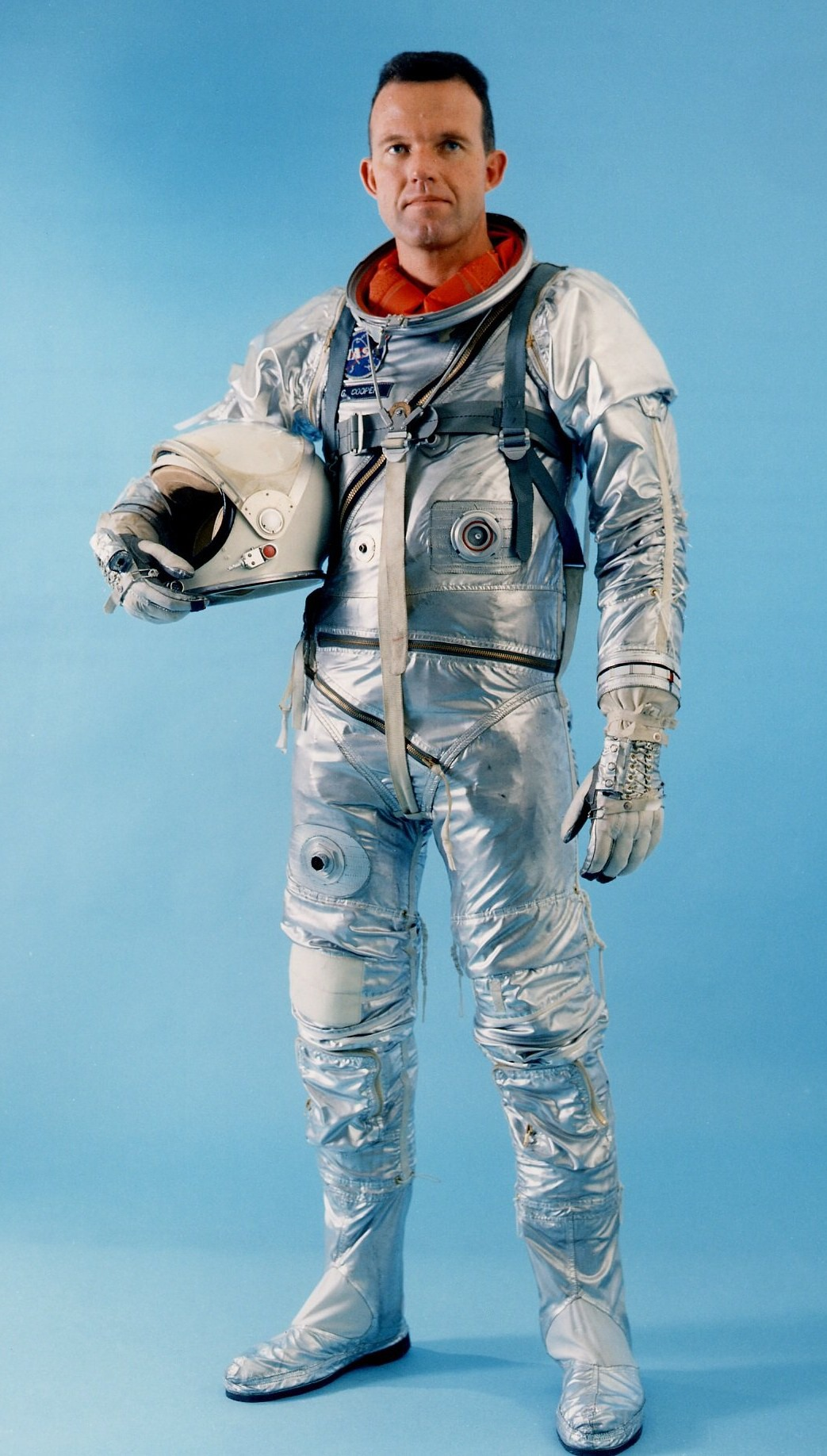
Cooper in his Mercury spacesuit, the Navy Mark IV

In January 1959, Cooper received unexpected orders to report to Washington, D.C. There was no indication what it was about, but his commanding officer, Major General Marcus F. Cooper (no relation) recalled an announcement in the newspaper saying that a contract had been awarded to McDonnell Aircraft in St. Louis, Missouri, to build a space capsule, and advised his officers not to volunteer for astronaut training. "I don't want my best pilots involved in some idiotic program." On February 2, 1959, Cooper attended a briefing of the National Aeronautics and Space Administration on Project Mercury, and the part astronauts would play in it. Cooper went through the selection process with another 109 pilots, and was not surprised when he was accepted as the youngest of the first seven American astronauts.

During the selection interviews, Cooper had been asked about his domestic relationship, and had lied, saying that he and Trudy had a good, stable marriage. In fact, they had separated four months before, and she was living with their daughters in San Diego while he occupied a bachelor's quarters at Edwards. Aware that NASA wanted to project an image of its astronauts as loving family men, and that his story would not stand up to scrutiny, he drove down to San Diego to see Trudy at the first opportunity. Lured by the prospect of a great adventure for herself and her daughters, she agreed to go along with the charade and pretend that they were a happily married couple.

The identities of the Mercury Seven were announced at a press conference at Dolley Madison House in Washington, D.C., on April 9, 1959: Scott Carpenter, Gordon Cooper, John Glenn, Gus Grissom, Wally Schirra, Alan Shepard, and Deke Slayton. Each was assigned a different portion of the project along with other special assignments. Cooper specialized in the Redstone rocket, which would be used for the first sub-orbital spaceflights. He also chaired the Emergency Egress Committee, responsible for working out emergency launch pad escape procedures, and engaged Bo Randall to develop a personal survival knife for astronauts to carry.

The astronauts drew their salaries as military officers, and an important component of that was flight pay. In Cooper's case, it amounted to $145 a month (equivalent to $1,601 in 2025). NASA saw no reason to provide the astronauts with aircraft, so they had to fly to meetings around the country on commercial airlines. To continue earning their flight pay, Grissom and Slayton would go out on the weekend to Langley Air Force Base, and attempt to put in the required four hours a month, competing for T-33 aircraft with senior deskbound colonels and generals.

Cooper traveled to McGhee Tyson Air National Guard Base in Tennessee, where a friend let him fly higher-performance F-104B jets. This came up when Cooper had lunch with William Hines, a reporter for The Washington Star, and was duly reported in the paper. Cooper then discussed the issue with Congressman James G. Fulton. The matter was taken up by the House Committee on Science and Astronautics. Within weeks the astronauts had priority access to USAF F-102s, something which Cooper considered a "hot plane", but which could still take off from and land at short civilian airfields; however, this incident did not make Cooper popular with senior NASA management.

After General Motors executive Ed Cole presented Shepard with a brand-new Chevrolet Corvette, Jim Rathmann, a Chevrolet dealer in Melbourne, Florida, convinced Cole to turn this into an ongoing marketing campaign. Henceforth, astronauts were able to lease brand-new Corvettes for a dollar a year. All of the Mercury Seven except Glenn took up the offer. Cooper, Grissom, and Shepard raced their Corvettes around Cape Canaveral, with the police ignoring their exploits. From a marketing perspective, it was very successful and helped the highly priced Corvette become established as a desirable brand. Cooper held licenses with the Sports Car Club of America (SCCA) and the National Association for Stock Car Auto Racing (NASCAR). He also enjoyed racing speedboats.

Cooper served as capsule communicator (CAPCOM) for NASA's first sub-orbital spaceflight, by Alan Shepard in Mercury-Redstone 3, and Scott Carpenter's orbital flight on Mercury-Atlas 7, and was backup pilot for Wally Schirra in Mercury-Atlas 8.

=== Mercury-Atlas 9 ===
After Mercury-Atlas 8, Cooper was selected for the next mission, Mercury-Atlas 9 (MA-9). Apart from Slayton, who had been grounded due to an idiopathic atrial fibrillation, he was the only one of the Mercury Seven who had not yet flown in space. Cooper's selection was publicly announced on November 14, 1962, with Shepard designated as his backup.

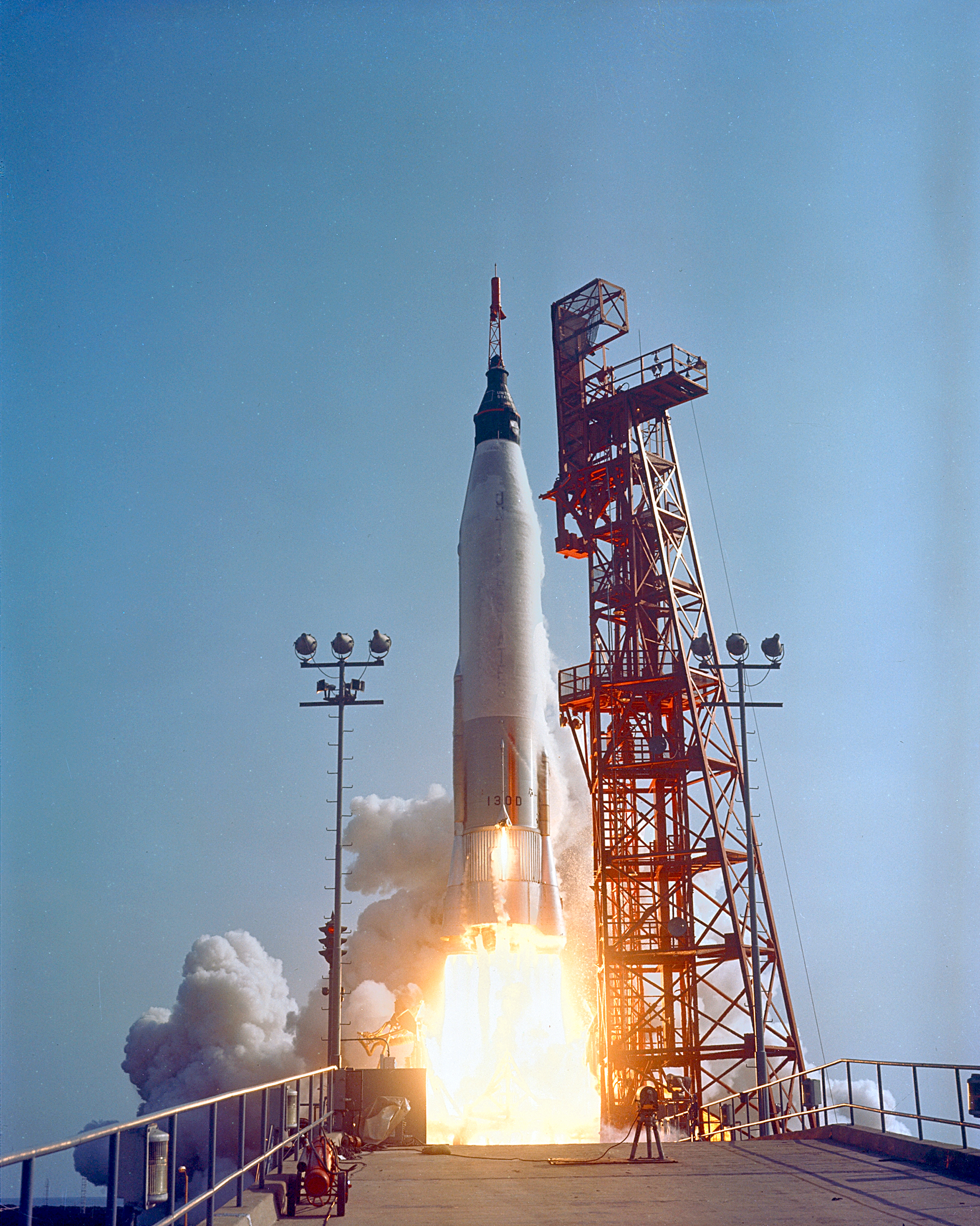
Mercury-Atlas 9 lifts off from Cape Canaveral Air Force Station Launch Complex 14 on May 15, 1963

Project Mercury had begun with a goal of ultimately flying an 18-orbit, 27-hour mission, known as the manned one-day mission. On November 9, senior staff at the Manned Spacecraft Center decided to fly a 22-orbit mission as MA-9. Project Mercury remained years behind the Soviet Union's space program, which had already flown a 64-orbit mission in Vostok 3. When Atlas 130-D, the booster designated for MA-9, first emerged from the factory in San Diego on January 30, 1963, it failed to pass inspection and was returned to the factory. For Schirra's MA-8 mission, 20 modifications had been made to the Mercury spacecraft; for Cooper's MA-9, 183 changes were made. Cooper decided to name his spacecraft, Mercury Spacecraft No. 20, Faith 7. NASA public affairs officers could see the newspaper headlines if the spacecraft were lost: "The United States today lost Faith".

After an argument with NASA Deputy Administrator Walter C. Williams over last-minute changes to his pressure suit to insert a new medical probe, a potentially dangerous modification if it leaked when he was in space, Cooper angrily buzzed Hangar S at Cape Canaveral in an F-102 and lit the afterburner. Williams told Slayton he was prepared to replace Cooper with Alan Shepard. They decided not to, but not to let Cooper know immediately. Instead, Slayton told Cooper that Williams was looking to ground whoever buzzed Hangar S. According to Cooper, Slayton later told him that President John F. Kennedy had intervened to prevent his removal.

Cooper was launched into space on May 15, 1963, aboard the Faith 7 spacecraft, for what turned out to be the last of the Project Mercury missions. Because MA-9 would orbit over nearly every part of Earth from 33 degrees north to 33 degrees south, NASA needed to stage recovery assets all over the globe. A total of 28 ships, 171 aircraft, and 18,000 servicemen were assigned to support the mission. Cooper orbited the Earth 22 times and logged more time in space than all five previous Mercury astronauts combined: 34 hours, 19 minutes, and 49 seconds. Cooper achieved an altitude of 267 kilometres (165.9 mi) at apogee. He was the first American astronaut to sleep, not only in orbit, but on the launch pad during a countdown.

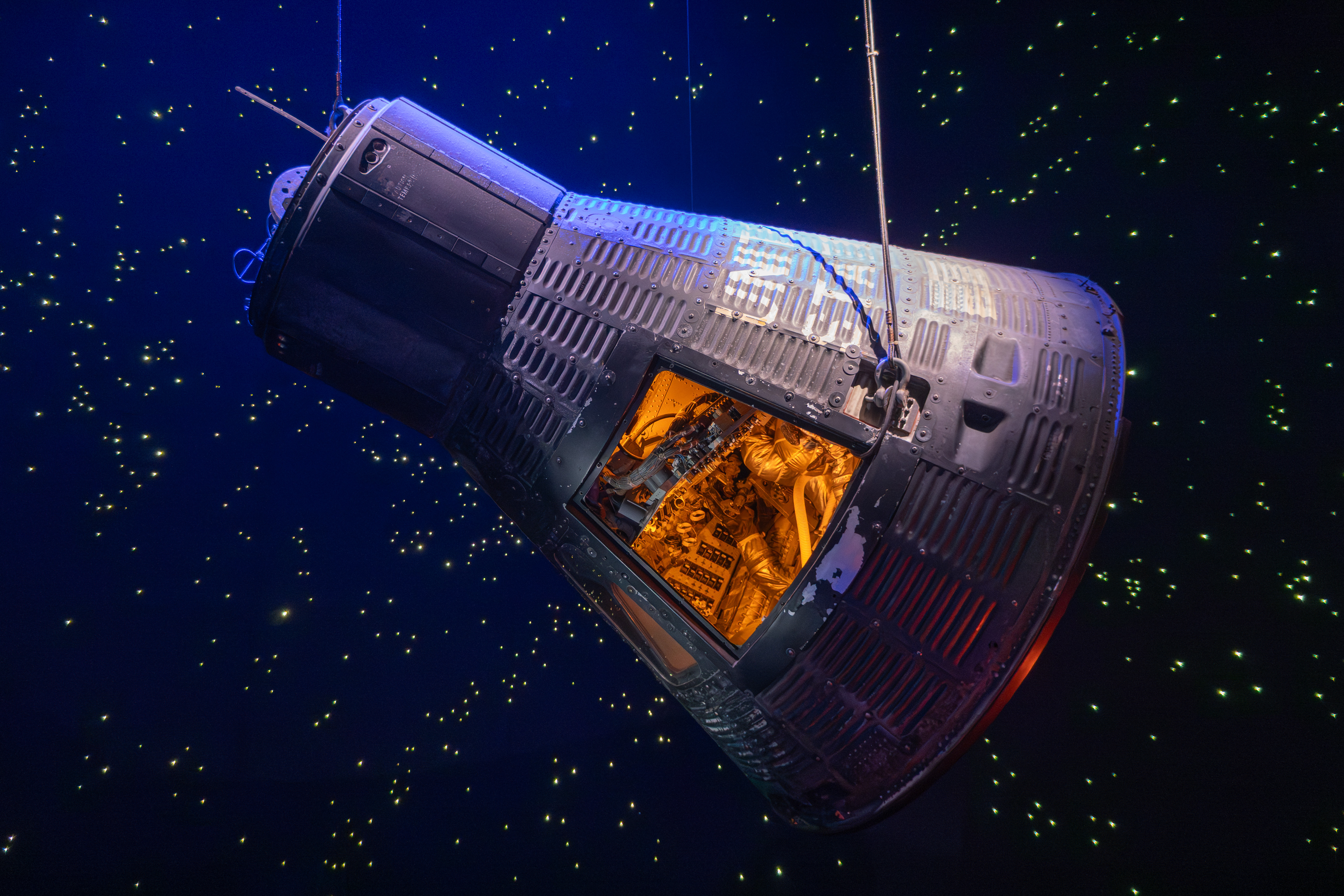
Faith 7 on display at Space Center Houston

There were several mission-threatening technical problems toward the end of Faith 7's flight. During the 19th orbit, the capsule had a power failure. Carbon dioxide levels began rising, both in Cooper's suit and in the cabin, and the cabin temperature climbed to over 54 °C (130 °F). The power failure caused the clock and then the gyroscopes to fail, but the radio, which was connected directly to the battery, remained working, and allowed Cooper to communicate with the mission controllers. Like all Mercury flights, MA-9 was originally designed to be fully controlled from the ground, a controversial engineering decision which reduced the role of an astronaut to that of a passenger, and prompted Chuck Yeager to describe Mercury astronauts as "Spam in a can". "This flight would put an end to all that nonsense," Cooper later wrote. "My electronics were shot and a pilot had the stick."

Turning to his understanding of star patterns, Cooper took manual control of the tiny capsule and successfully estimated the correct pitch for re-entry into the atmosphere. Precision was needed in the calculation; small errors in timing or orientation could produce large errors in the landing point. Cooper drew lines on the capsule window to help him check his orientation before firing the re-entry rockets. "So I used my wrist watch for time," he later recalled, "my eyeballs out the window for attitude. Then I fired my retrorockets at the right time and landed right by the carrier."

Faith 7 splashed down six point four kilometres (4 mi) ahead of the recovery ship, the aircraft carrier USS Kearsarge. Faith 7 was hoisted on board by a helicopter with Cooper still inside. Once on deck, he used the explosive bolts to blow open the hatch. Post-flight inspections and analyses studied the causes and nature of the electrical problems that had plagued the final hours of the flight, but no fault was found with the performance of the pilot.

On May 22, New York City gave Cooper a ticker-tape parade witnessed by more than four million spectators. The parade concluded with a congratulatory luncheon at the Waldorf-Astoria attended by 1,900 people, where dignitaries such as Vice President Lyndon B. Johnson and former president Herbert Hoover made speeches honoring Cooper.

=== Project Gemini ===
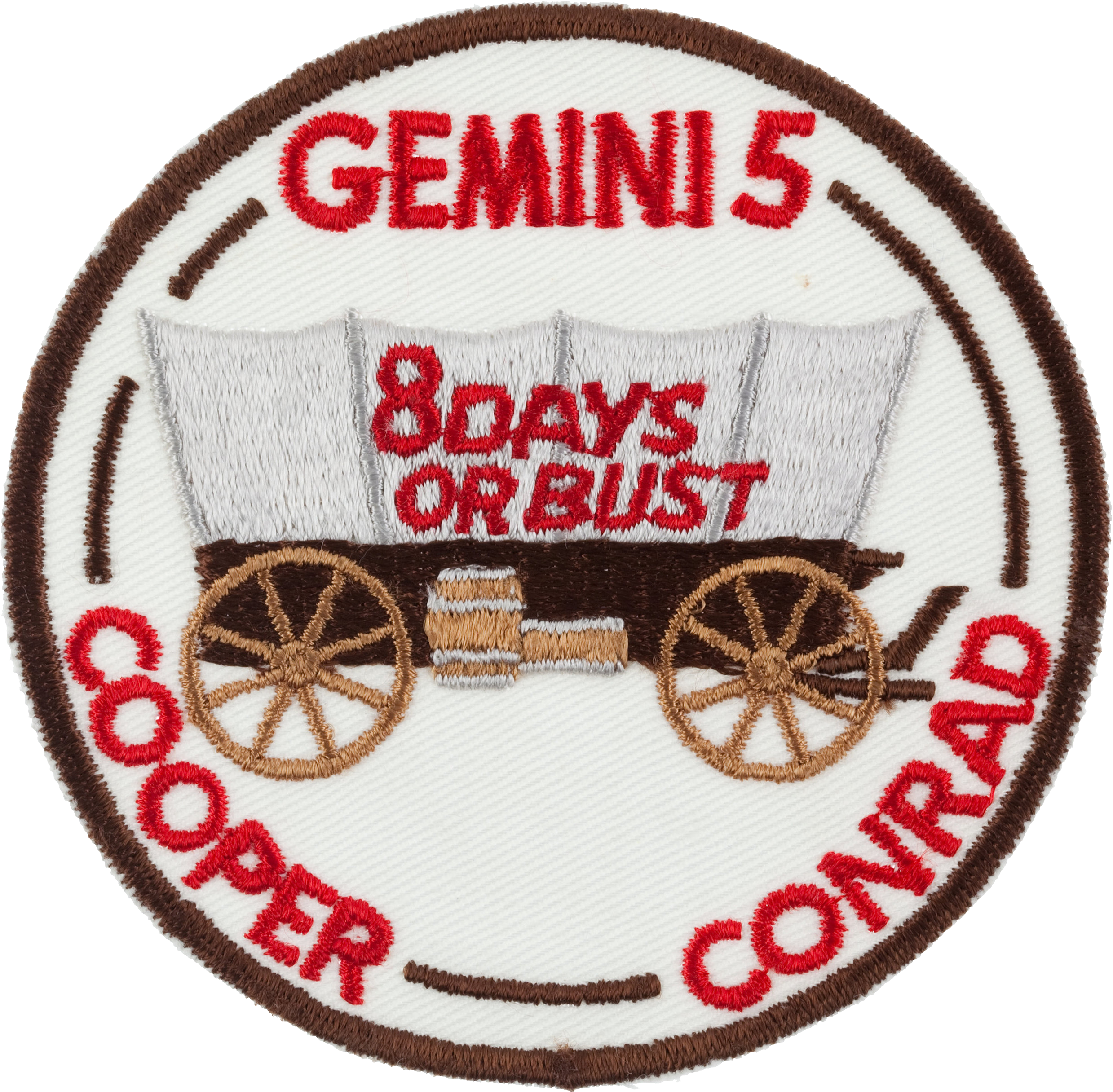
Cooper began the tradition of NASA mission insignia with this design for Gemini 5.

MA-9 was the last of the Project Mercury flights. Walt Williams and others wanted to follow up with a three-day Mercury-Atlas 10 (MA-10) mission, but NASA HQ had already announced that there would be no MA-10 if MA-9 was successful. Shepard in particular was eager to fly the mission, for which he had been designated. He even attempted to enlist the support of President Kennedy. An official decision that there would be no MA-10 was made by NASA Administrator James E. Webb on June 22, 1963. Had the mission been approved, Shepard might not have flown it, as he was grounded in October 1963, and MA-10 might well have been flown by Cooper, who was his backup. In January 1964 the press reported that the Democratic Party of Oklahoma discussed running Cooper for the United States Senate.

Project Mercury was followed by Project Gemini, which took its name from the fact that it carried two men instead of just one. Slayton designated Cooper as commander of Gemini 5, an eight-day, 120-orbit mission. Cooper's assignment was officially announced on February 8, 1965. Pete Conrad, one of the nine astronauts selected in 1962, was designated as his co-pilot, with Neil Armstrong and Elliot See as their respective backups. On July 22, Cooper and Conrad went through a rehearsal of a double launch of Gemini atop a Titan II booster from Launch Complex 19 and an Atlas-Agena target vehicle from Launch Complex 14. At the end of the successful test, the erector could not be raised, and the two astronauts had to be retrieved with a cherry picker, an escape device that Cooper had devised for Project Mercury and insisted be retained for Gemini.

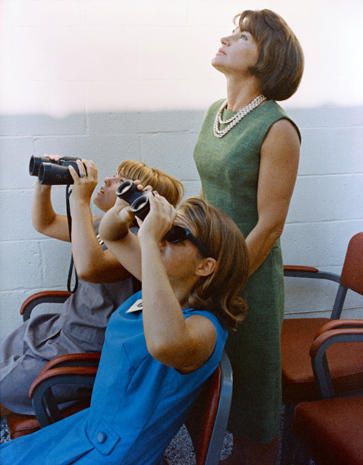
Cooper's wife Trudy watches the launch of Gemini 5 with their teenage daughters, Cam and Jan

Cooper and Conrad wanted to name their spacecraft Lady Bird after Lady Bird Johnson, the First Lady of the United States, but Webb turned down their request; he wanted to "depersonalize" the space program. Cooper and Conrad then came up with the idea of a mission patch, similar to the organizational emblems worn by military units. The patch was intended to commemorate all the hundreds of people directly involved, not just the astronauts. Cooper and Conrad chose an embroidered cloth patch sporting the names of the two crew members, a Conestoga wagon, and the slogan "8 Days or Bust", which referred to the expected mission duration. Webb ultimately approved the design, but insisted on the removal of the slogan from the official version of the patch, feeling it placed too much emphasis on the mission length and not the experiments, and fearing the public might see the mission as a failure if it did not last the full duration. The patch was worn on the right breast of the astronauts' uniforms below their nameplates and opposite the NASA emblems worn on the left.

The mission was postponed from August 9 to 19 to give Cooper and Conrad more time to train, and was then delayed for two days due to a storm. Gemini 5 was launched at 09:00 EST (14:00 UTC) on August 21, 1965. The Titan II booster placed them in a 163-by-349-kilometer (101 by 217 mi) orbit. Cooper's biggest concern was the fuel cell, which combined hydrogen and oxygen to produce electric power and drinking water. To make it last eight days, Cooper intended to operate it at a low pressure, but when it started to dip too low, the Flight Controllers advised him to switch on the oxygen heater. It eventually stabilized at 49 newtons per square centimetre (490 kPa; 71 psi)—lower than it had ever been operated at before. While MA-9 had become uncomfortably warm, Gemini 5 became cold. There were also problems with the Orbit Attitude and Maneuvering System thrusters, which became erratic, and two of them failed.

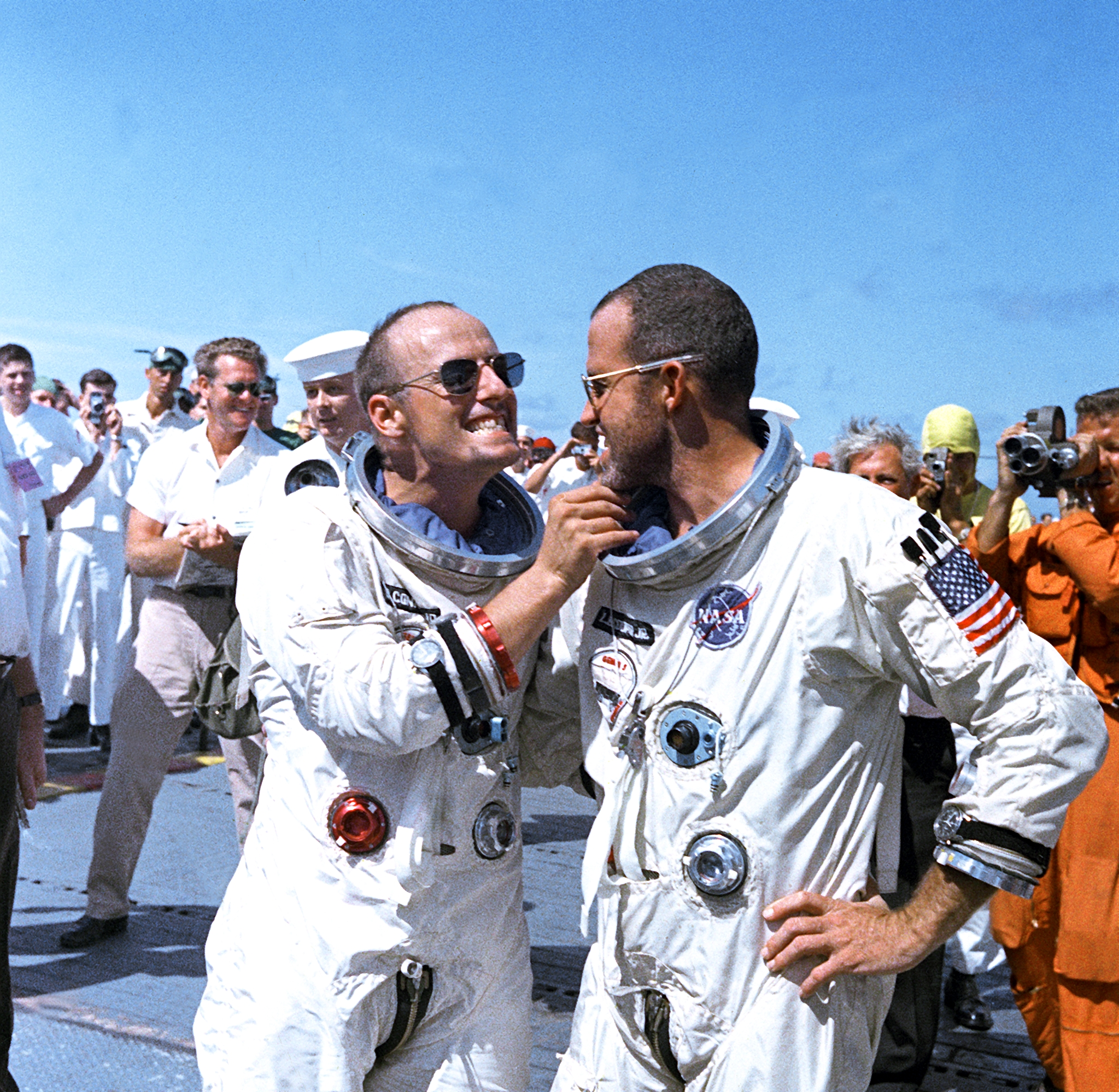
Pete Conrad (left) and Cooper on deck of recovery carrier USS Lake Champlain after Gemini 5 mission

Gemini 5 was originally intended to practice orbital rendezvous with an Agena target vehicle, but this had been deferred to a later mission owing to problems with the Agena. Nonetheless, Cooper practiced bringing his spacecraft to a predetermined location in space. This raised confidence for achieving rendezvous with an actual spacecraft on subsequent missions, and ultimately in lunar orbit. Cooper and Conrad were able to carry out all but one of the scheduled experiments, most of which were related to orbital photography.

The mission was cut short by the appearance of Hurricane Betsy in the planned recovery area. Cooper fired the retrorockets on the 120th orbit. Splashdown was 130 kilometers (81 mi) short of the target. A computer error had set the Earth's rotation at 360 degrees per day, whereas it is actually 360.98. The difference was significant in a spacecraft. The error would have been larger had Cooper not recognized the problem when the reentry gauge indicated that they were too high, and attempted to compensate by increasing the bank angle from 53 to 90 degrees to the left to increase the drag. Helicopters plucked them from the sea and took them to the recovery ship, the aircraft carrier USS Lake Champlain.

The two astronauts established a new space endurance record by traveling a distance of 5,331,745 kilometres (3,312,993 mi) in 190 hours and 56 minutes—just short of eight days—showing that astronauts could survive in space for the length of time necessary to go from the Earth to the Moon and back. Cooper became the first astronaut to make a second orbital flight.

Cooper served as backup Command Pilot for Gemini 12, the last of the Gemini missions, with Gene Cernan as his pilot.

=== Project Apollo ===
NASA management was increasingly concerned about the dangerous motor sports Cooper engaged in. In November 1964, Cooper entered the $28,000 Salton City 500-mile (800 km) boat race with racehorse owner Ogden Phipps and racing car driver Chuck Daigh. They were in fourth place when a cracked motor forced them to withdraw. The next year, Cooper and Grissom had an entry in the race, but were disqualified after failing to make a mandatory meeting. Cooper competed in the Southwest Championship Drag Boat races at La Porte, Texas, later in 1965, and in the 1967 Orange Bowl Regatta with fire fighter Red Adair. In 1968, he entered the 24 Hours of Daytona with Charles Buckley, the NASA chief of security at the Kennedy Space Center. The night before the race, NASA management ordered him to withdraw due to the dangers involved. Cooper upset NASA management by quipping to the press that "NASA wants astronauts to be tiddlywinks players."

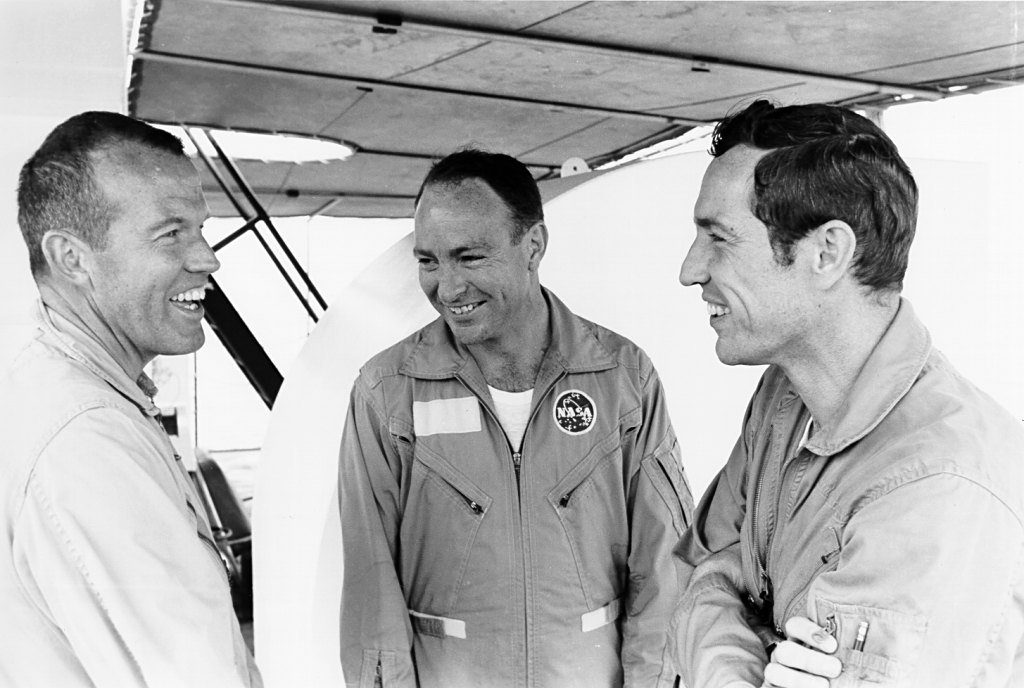
Apollo 10 backup crew (left to right) Cooper, Edgar Mitchell, and Donn Eisele during water egress training in April 1969.

Cooper was selected as backup commander for the May 1969 Apollo 10 mission. This placed him in line for the position of commander of Apollo 13, according to the usual crew rotation procedure established by Slayton as Director of Flight Crew Operations. However, when Shepard, the Chief of the Astronaut Office, returned to flight status in May 1969, Slayton replaced Cooper with Shepard as commander of this crew. This mission subsequently became Apollo 14 to give Shepard more time to train. Loss of this command placed Cooper further down the flight rotation, meaning he would not fly until one of the later flights, if ever.

Slayton alleged that Cooper had developed a lax attitude towards training during the Gemini program; for the Gemini 5 mission, other astronauts had to coax him into the simulator. However, according to Walter Cunningham, Cooper and Scott Carpenter were the only Mercury astronauts who consistently attended geology classes. Slayton later asserted that he never intended to rotate Cooper to another mission, and assigned him to the Apollo 10 backup crew simply because of a lack of qualified astronauts with command experience at the time. Slayton noted that Cooper had a slim chance of receiving the Apollo 13 command if he did an outstanding job as backup commander of Apollo 10, but Slayton felt that Cooper did not.

Dismayed by his stalled astronaut career, Cooper retired from NASA and the USAF on July 31, 1970, with the rank of colonel, having flown 222 hours in space. Soon after he divorced Trudy, he married Suzan Taylor, a schoolteacher, in 1972. They had two daughters: Colleen Taylor, born in 1979, and Elizabeth Jo, born in 1980. They remained married until he died in 2004.

== Other activities and later life ==
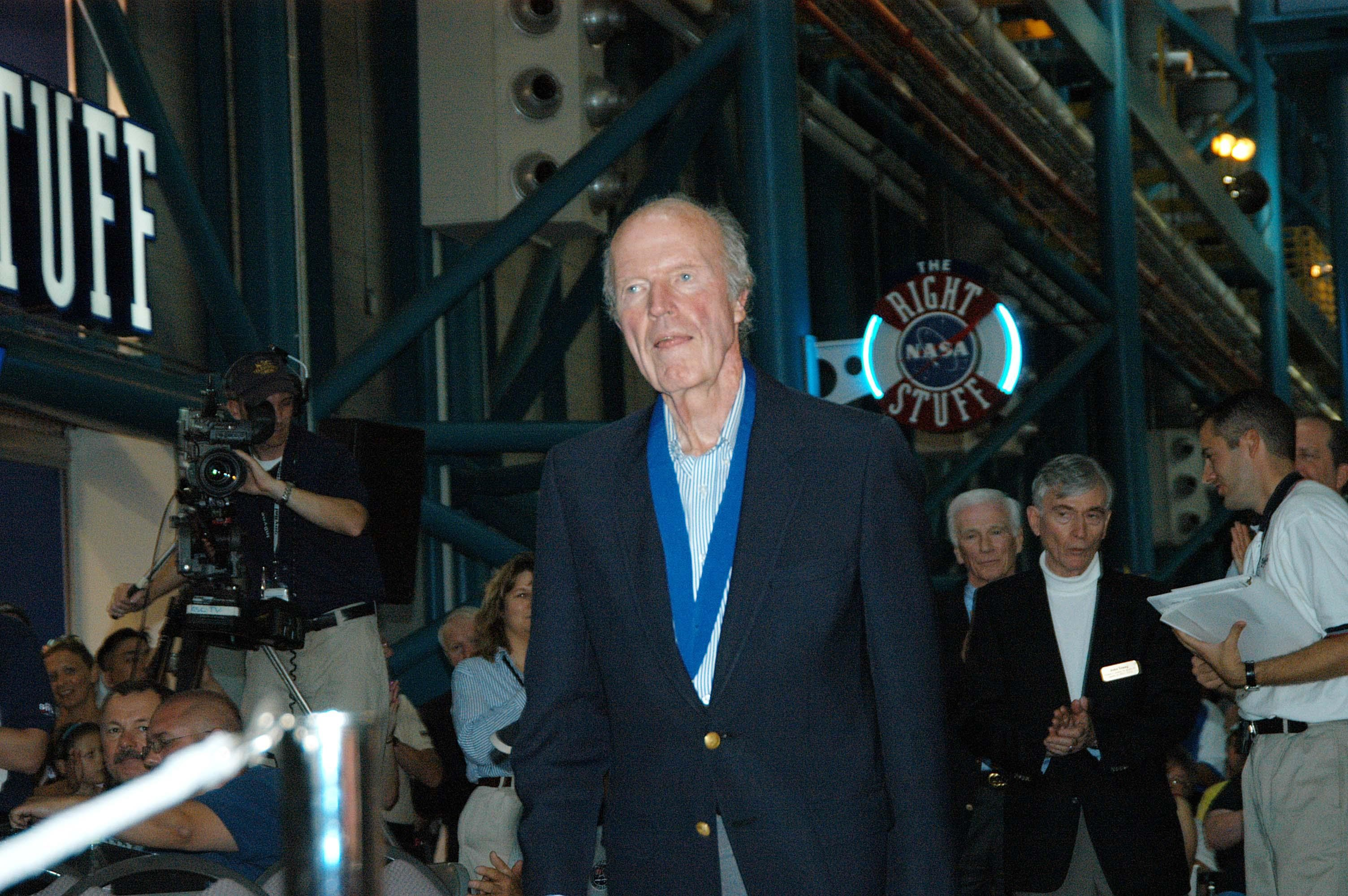
Cooper at an induction ceremony of the U.S. Astronaut Hall of Fame in 2004. Astronauts John Young and Gene Cernan stand behind him.

After leaving NASA, Cooper served on several corporate boards and as a technical consultant for more than a dozen companies in fields ranging from high-performance boat design to energy, construction, and aircraft design. Between 1962 and 1967, he was president of Performance Unlimited, Inc., a manufacturer and distributor of racing and marine engines and fiberglass boats.

He was president of GCR, which designed, tested, and raced championship cars, conducted tire tests for race cars, and worked on the installation of turbine engines on cars from 1963 to 1967, and president of Teletest, which designed and installed advanced telemetry systems from 1965 to 1970. He was involved with Doubloon, which designed and built treasure hunting equipment from 1966 to 1969, and Cosmos, which conducted archeological exploration projects from 1968 to 1969.

As part-owner and race project manager of the Profile Race Team from 1968 to 1970, Cooper designed and raced high-performance boats. Between 1968 and 1974, he served as a technical consultant at Republic Corp., General Motors, Ford, and Chrysler Motor Companies, where he was a consultant on design and construction of various automotive components. He was also a technical consultant for Canaveral International, Inc., for which he developed technical products and served in public relations on its land development projects, and served on the board of directors of APECO, Campcom LowCom, and Crafttech.

Cooper was president of his own consulting firm, Gordon Cooper & Associates, Inc., which was involved in technical projects ranging from airline and aerospace fields to land and hotel development. From 1973 to 1975, he worked for The Walt Disney Company as the vice president of research and development for Epcot. In 1989, he became the chief executive of Galaxy Group, Inc., a company that designed and improved small airplanes.

== UFO sightings ==
In Cooper's autobiography, Leap of Faith, co-authored with journalist Bruce Henderson, he recounted his experiences with the Air Force and NASA, along with his efforts to expose an alleged UFO conspiracy. In his review of the book, space historian Robert Pearlman wrote: "While no one can argue with someone's experiences, in the case of Cooper's own sightings, I found some difficulty understanding how someone so connected with groundbreaking technology and science could easily embrace ideas such as extraterrestrial visits with little more than anecdotal evidence."

Cooper claimed to have seen his first UFO while flying over West Germany in 1951, although he denied reports he had seen a UFO during his Mercury flight. On May 3, 1957, when Cooper was at Edwards, he had a crew set up a Cinetheodolite system, made by the German Askania Werke company, on a dry lake bed. This system could take pictures at thirty frames per second as an aircraft landed. The crew consisted of James Bittick and Jack Gettys, who began work at the site just before 08:00, with both still and motion picture cameras. According to Cooper's accounts, when they returned later that morning, they reported that they had seen a "strange-looking, saucer-like" aircraft that did not make a sound either on landing or take-off.

Cooper recalled that these men, who saw experimental aircraft regularly as part of their job, were clearly unnerved. They explained how the saucer hovered over them, landed 46 metres (50 yd) away using three extended landing gear, and then took off as they approached for a closer look. He called a special Pentagon number to report such incidents, and was instructed to have their film developed, but to make no prints of it, and send it in to the Pentagon right away in a locked courier pouch.

As Cooper had not been instructed to not look at the negatives before sending them, he did look at them. Cooper claimed that the quality of the photography was excellent, and what he saw was exactly what Bittick and Gettys had described to him. He expected that there would be a follow-up investigation, since an aircraft of unknown origin had landed at a classified military installation, but never heard about the incident again. He was never able to track down what happened to those photos, and assumed they ended up going to the Air Force's official UFO investigation, Project Blue Book, which was based at Wright-Patterson Air Force Base.

Cooper claimed until his death that the U.S. government was indeed covering up information about UFOs. He pointed out that there were hundreds of reports made by his fellow pilots, many coming from military jet pilots sent to respond to radar or visual sightings. In his memoirs, Cooper wrote he had seen unexplained aircraft several times during his career, and that hundreds of reports had been made. In 1978, he testified before the UN on the topic. Throughout his later life, Cooper repeatedly expressed in interviews that he had seen UFOs, and described his recollections for the 2003 documentary Out of the Blue.

== Death ==
Cooper died at age 77 from heart failure at his home in Ventura, California, on October 4, 2004. A portion of his ashes, along with those of Star Trek actor James Doohan and 206 others, was launched from New Mexico on April 29, 2007, on a sub-orbital memorial flight by a privately owned UP Aerospace SpaceLoft XL sounding rocket. The capsule carrying the ashes fell back toward Earth as planned; it was lost in a mountainous landscape. The search was obstructed by bad weather, but after a few weeks, the capsule was found, and the ashes it carried were returned to the families. The ashes were then launched on the Explorers orbital mission on August 3, 2008, but were lost when the Falcon 1 rocket failed two minutes into the flight.

On May 22, 2012, another portion of Cooper's ashes was among those of 308 people included on the SpaceX COTS Demo Flight 2 that was bound for the International Space Station. This flight, using the Falcon 9 launch vehicle and the Dragon capsule, was uncrewed. The second stage and the burial canister remained in the initial orbit that the Dragon C2+ was inserted into, and burned up in the Earth's atmosphere a month later.

== Awards and honors ==
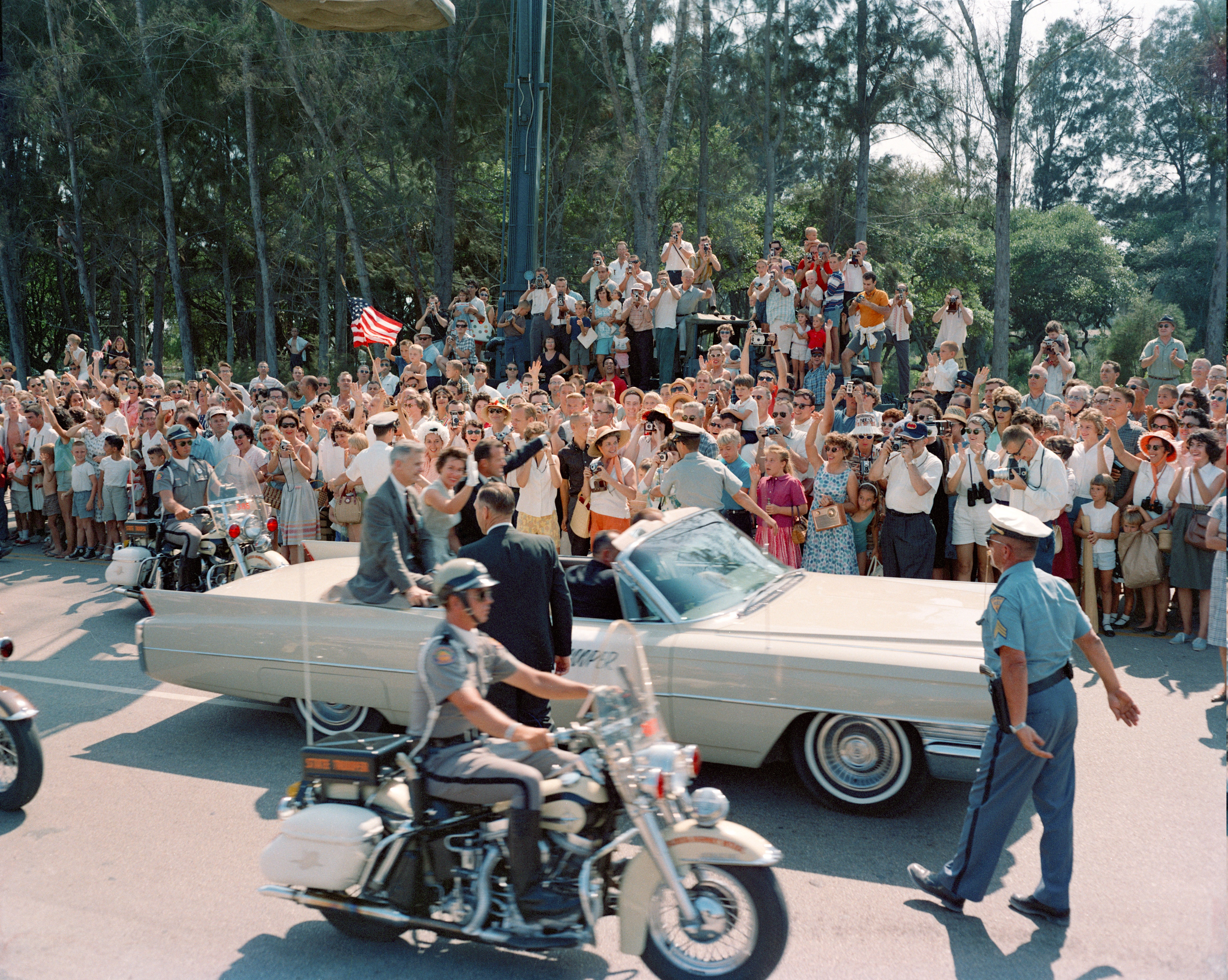
Cooper at a parade given in his honor, Patrick Air Force Base, Florida, May 1963

Cooper received many awards, including the Legion of Merit, the Distinguished Flying Cross with oak leaf cluster, the NASA Exceptional Service Medal, the NASA Distinguished Service Medal, the Collier Trophy, the Harmon Trophy, the DeMolay Legion of Honor, the John F. Kennedy Trophy, the Iven C. Kincheloe Award, the Air Force Association Trophy, the John J. Montgomery Award, the General Thomas D. White Trophy, the University of Hawaiʻi Regents Medal, the Columbus Medal, and the Silver Antelope Award. He received an honorary D.Sc. from Oklahoma State University in 1967.

He was one of five Oklahoman astronauts inducted into the Oklahoma Aviation and Space Hall of Fame in 1980. He was inducted into the International Space Hall of Fame in 1981, and the U.S. Astronaut Hall of Fame on May 11, 1990.

Cooper was a member of the Society of Experimental Test Pilots, the American Institute of Aeronautics and Astronautics, the American Astronautical Society, Scottish Rite and York Rite Masons, Shriners, the Royal Order of Jesters, the Rotary Club, Order of Daedalians, Confederate Air Force, Adventurers' Club of Los Angeles, and Boy Scouts of America. He was a Master Mason (member of Carbondale Lodge # 82 in Carbondale, Colorado), and was given the honorary 33rd Degree by the Scottish Rite Masonic body.

== Cultural influence ==
Cooper's Mercury astronaut career and appealing personality were depicted in the 1983 film The Right Stuff, in which he was portrayed by Dennis Quaid. Cooper worked closely with the production company, and every line uttered by Quaid was reportedly attributable to Cooper's recollection. Quaid met with Cooper before the casting call and learned his mannerisms. Quaid had his hair cut and dyed to match Cooper's appearance in the 1950s and 1960s.

Cooper was later portrayed by Robert C. Treveiler in the 1998 HBO miniseries From the Earth to the Moon, and by Bret Harrison in the 2015 ABC TV series The Astronaut Wives Club. That year, he was also portrayed by Colin Hanks in the Season 3 episode "Oklahoma" of Drunk History, written by Laura Steinel, which retold the story of his Mercury-Atlas 9 flight. In 2019, National Geographic began filming a television series based on Tom Wolfe's 1979 book The Right Stuff, with Colin O'Donoghue portraying Cooper. Cooper appeared as himself in an episode of the television series CHiPs, and during the early 1980s made regular call-in appearances on chat shows hosted by David Letterman, Merv Griffin and Mike Douglas. Cooper appeared as himself in Season 2, episode 19 of the television series The Courtship of Eddie's Father in 1971.

The 2019 series For All Mankind has Gordon "Gordo" Stevens, a character based in part on him, and the Thunderbirds character Gordon Tracy was named after him. Cooper was a major contributor to the book In the Shadow of the Moon (published after his death), which offered his final published thoughts on his life and career.

While he was in space, Cooper recorded dark spots he noticed in the waters of the Caribbean. He believed these anomalies might be the locations of shipwrecks. The 2017 Discovery Channel docu-series Cooper's Treasure followed Darrell Miklos as he searched through Cooper's files to discover the location of the suspected shipwrecks.
