= Celestis =

Space burial business

Celestis, Inc.
- Type: Subsidiary
- Industry: Space burials
- Founded: 1994
- Founders: Charles M. Chafer; R. Chan Tysor
- Headquarters: Houston, Texas, United States
- Parent: Space Services Inc.
- Website: celestis.com

Celestis, Inc. is a company that launches cremated human remains into space, a procedure known as a space burial. It is a subsidiary of the private space company Space Services Inc. The company purchases launches as a secondary payload on various launch vehicles, and launches samples of a person's cremated remains. Launching an individual's entire cremated remains (which weigh between four and eight pounds) would be prohibitively expensive for most people, so Celestis launches small portions of 1-7 grams.

== History ==
Celestis has flown a number of notable participants over the years. Its first flight – The Founders Flight — carried cremated remains of Star Trek creator Gene Roddenberry and 1960s icon Timothy Leary into Earth orbit. Also on board were remains of physicist and space visionary Gerard K. O'Neill, noted rocket scientist Krafft A. Ehricke, and 20 others. Dr. Eugene Shoemaker — a famous planetary geologist and co-discoverer of Comet Shoemaker-Levy 9 – was launched to the Moon on NASA's Lunar Prospector mission in 1998: Celestis helped friends of Dr. Shoemaker include a sample of his cremated remains on that mission. Mercury 7 astronaut L. Gordon Cooper, Star Trek actor James Doohan ("Mr. Scott"), and a host of others from various walks of life were launched on board The Legacy Flight in 2007. Titanic explorer Ralph White was on board the Discovery and Pioneer flights.

Family members and friends of flight participants usually can attend the launch. Celestis usually arranges for a tour of the launch facility and hosts a non-sectarian memorial service prior to the launch. Celestis also helps people prearrange their own memorial spaceflights for the future.

== Flights ==
Launch date / time (UTC)	Launch vehicle	Flight name	Orbit	Notable Individuals	Remarks
21 April 1997, 11:59	Pegasus-XL	Founders	Earth orbit	Beauford Franklin, rocket scientist Gene Roddenberry, Star Trek creator Gerard O'Neill, physicist Krafft Ehricke, rocket scientist Timothy Leary, psychologist, writer	Reached Earth orbit; Reentered atmosphere 20 May 2002
7 January 1998, 02:29	Athena	Luna-01	Lunar orbit	Eugene Merle Shoemaker, astronomer	Attached to Lunar Prospector; Landed 31 July 1999
10 December 1998, 13:20	Taurus	Ad Astra	Earth orbit		Reached Earth orbit; still on orbit
21 December 1999, 07:13	Taurus	Millennial	Earth orbit	Charles Oren Bennett, illustrator	Reached Earth orbit; still on orbit
21 September 2001, 18:49	Taurus	Odyssey	Earth orbit		Failed to orbit
28 April 2007, 14:56	SpaceLoft XL	Legacy	Earthrise (suborbital)	Gordon Cooper, astronaut James Doohan, Star Trek actor	Reached space and returned to Earth, as planned
3 August 2008, 03:34	Falcon 1	Explorers	Earth orbit	Gordon Cooper, astronaut James Doohan, Star Trek actor	Failed to orbit
2 May 2009, 14:00	SpaceLoft XL	Discovery	Earthrise (suborbital)	Ralph White, explorer	Failed to reach space
4 May 2010, 12:41	SpaceLoft XL	Pioneer	Earthrise (suborbital)	Ralph White, explorer	Reached space and returned to Earth, as planned
20 May 2011, 13:21	SpaceLoft XL	Goddard	Earthrise (suborbital)		Reached space and returned to Earth, as planned
22 May 2012, 07:44	Falcon 9	New Frontier	Earth orbit	Gordon Cooper, astronaut James Doohan, Star Trek actor	Reached orbit, on a canister attached to the Falcon 9 launch vehicle's second stage. Reentered Earth's atmosphere on 27 June 2012. It carried the ashes of 308 people, 1-gram per person.
21 June 2013, 11:57	SpaceLoft XL	Centennial	Earthrise (suborbital)	Candy Johnson, entertainer	Reached space and returned to Earth, as planned
23 October 2014, 13:33	SpaceLoft XL	Conestoga	Earthrise (suborbital)	CJ Twomey	Reached space and returned to Earth, as planned
6 November 2015, 15:01	SpaceLoft XL	Tribute	Earthrise (suborbital)		Reached space and returned to Earth, as planned
17 September 2018, 14:09	SpaceLoft XL	Starseeker	Earthrise (suborbital)		Reached space and returned to Earth, as planned
25 June 2019, 06:30	Falcon Heavy	Heritage	Earth orbit	William Reid Pogue, astronaut Masaru Tomita, baseball player	Reached orbit successfully
24 January 2023, 15:00	Falcon 9	Horizon	Earth orbit		Reached orbit successfully
25 May 2022, 18:35	Falcon 9	Ascension	Earth orbit		Reached orbit successfully
15 April 2023, 06:48	Falcon 9	Excelsior	Earth orbit	Dave Barrett, journalist	Reached orbit successfully
1 May 2023, 16:45	SpaceLoft-XL	Aurora	Earthrise (suborbital)	Philip K. Chapman, astronaut	Launch vehicle failure All the capsules containing the ashes were successfully recovered, and they are scheduled to be launched again in 2024 on the “Perseverance Flight”.
8 January 2024, 07:18	Vulcan Centaur	Tranquility	Lunar landing	Gene Roddenberry, Star Trek creator Majel Barrett, Star Trek actress Mareta West, first female Astrogeologist; Arthur C. Clarke, Science Fiction Writer	Reached orbit successfully, failure of Peregrine Mission One shortly after orbit led to abandonment of Lunar landing. Returned to Earth.
8 January 2024, 07:18	Vulcan Centaur	Enterprise	Heliocentric	Gene Roddenberry, Star Trek creator Majel Barrett, Star Trek actress James Doohan, Star Trek actor DeForest Kelley, Star Trek actor Nichelle Nichols, Star Trek actress Douglas Trumbull, Star Trek actor George Washington, US president John F. Kennedy, US president Dwight D. Eisenhower, US president Ronald Reagan, US president	Reached orbit successfully
16 August 2024, 18:56	Falcon 9	Harmony	Earth orbit	Philip K. Chapman, astronaut Michael Lampton, astronaut	Reached orbit successfully
