= New Mexico Spaceport Authority =

The New Mexico Spaceport Authority (NMSA) is a non-governmental panel, appointed by the governor of New Mexico, whose members represent the public sector in the development and construction of Spaceport America, the world's first purpose-built commercial spaceport.

Two-thirds of the $212 million used to build the spaceport was paid by the State of New Mexico with the rest provided by bonds backed by Doña Ana County and Sierra County, which will be partially repaid by locally generated gross receipts tax revenues. NMSA operates the spaceport, whose anchor tenant is Virgin Galactic, a component of the Virgin Group of global companies operated by Sir Richard Branson.

== Operational status ==
In February 2011, the governor of New Mexico appointed Christine Anderson as executive director of the Spaceport Authority. In April 2011, the Authority announced that its budget for fiscal year 2012 had been reduced by 57 percent. In March 2012, the Authority announced that it had completed what it called Phase I of the Virgin/Spaceport America construction project. This Phase I included a 10,000-foot runway, a terminal hangar, and a domed Space Operations Center. Phase II, the visitor center and actual liftoff pad, remained unbuilt as of March 2012.

== Current Events ==
The current status of Virgin Galactic, the sole prospective tenant of the New Mexico Spaceport and its Authority, has led members of the New Mexico legislature to question the feasibility of the spaceport. The spaceport has attempted to diversify its revenue, bringing in additional tenants such as SpaceX and SpinLaunch, opening a tourist center, hosting an annual rocket competition, and serving as a backdrop for commercials.

After the VSS Enterprise crash on October 31, 2014, Virgin Galactic indefinitely postponed its planned operational startup date in New Mexico. In November 2014, Anderson requested that the legislature consider creating an supplemental emergency fund to enable the spaceport to maintain its operations, and told lawmakers that the Authority will try to rent out the spaceport for "video shoots or concerts."

Anderson stepped down as executive director in 2016, and was replaced by aerospace professional Dan Hicks. Hicks was CEO of the spaceport until July 2020, when he was placed on administrative leave following a whistleblower complaint from the spaceport CFO. Hicks was fired in October, and the New Mexico Office of the State Auditor released a report concluding that Hicks had violated state law. In March 2021, Scott McLaughlin was chosen as the new head of New Mexico Spaceport Authority.

== See also ==
- California Space Authority
- Oklahoma Space Industry Development Authority
- Space Florida
- Virginia Commercial Space Flight Authority
