= Spaceport America =

Spaceport located in New Mexico, U.S.

Spaceport America Spaceport America logo.png
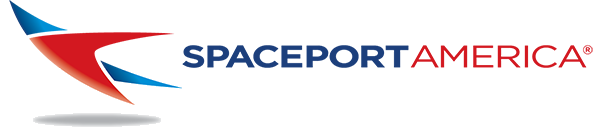

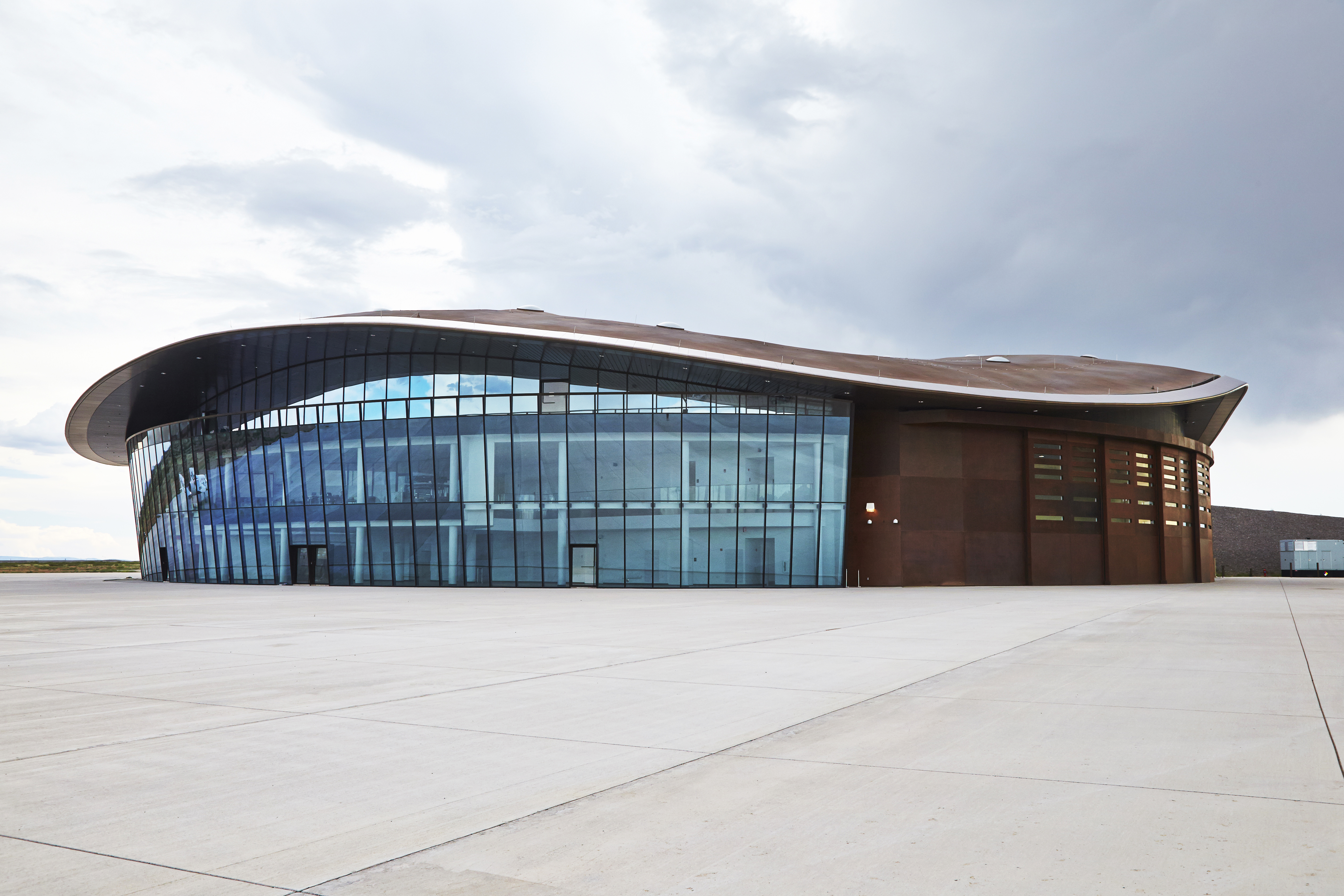
- Spaceport America terminal hangar facility in 2014
- IATA: none; ICAO: none; FAA LID: 9NM9

Summary
- Airport type: Private commercial spaceport
- Owner/Operator: New Mexico Spaceport Authority
- Location: Sierra County, New Mexico, near Truth or Consequences, New Mexico
- Hub for: Virgin Galactic, UP Aerospace, Exos Aerospace, Payload Specialties
- Elevation AMSL: 4,595 ft (1,401 m)
- Coordinates: 32°59′25″N 106°58′11″W
- Website: www.spaceportamerica.com

Map
- Location within New Mexico

Runways
Direction	Length		Surface
Direction	ft	m	Surface
16/34	12,000	3,657	Concrete

Spaceport America, formerly the Southwest Regional Spaceport, is an FAA-licensed spaceport located on 18,000 acres (7,300 ha) of State Trust Land in the Jornada del Muerto desert basin of the United States, 45 miles (72 km) north of Las Cruces, New Mexico and 20 miles (32 km) southeast of Truth or Consequences. With Virgin Galactic's launch of the VSS Unity, with three people aboard, on May 22, 2021, New Mexico became the third US state to launch humans into space after California and Florida.

Spaceport America bills itself as "the world's first purpose-built commercial spaceport", designed and constructed specifically for commercial users. The site is built to accommodate both vertical and horizontal launch aerospace vehicles, as well as an array of non-aerospace events and commercial activities. Spaceport America is owned and operated by the State of New Mexico, via a state agency, the New Mexico Spaceport Authority. The first rocket launch at Spaceport America occurred on September 25, 2006.

The current tenants working in the U.S. spaceport are HAPSMobile Aerovironment, UP Aerospace, SpinLaunch, and Virgin Galactic.

Spaceport America was officially declared open on October 18, 2011, the visitor center in Truth or Consequences became fully accessible to the general public on June 24, 2015, and after Virgin Galactic completed the interior buildout, the entire facility was deemed ready for operations in August 2019. Visitors can book private tours of the facility via the website or from the Visit Las Cruces organization or the visitors center in Truth or Consequences.

== History ==
Spaceport America began as a potential landing site for reentry capsules and then evolved into a test and operations site for the canceled Lockheed Martin VentureStar project. The first rocket launch at Spaceport America occurred on September 25, 2006.

=== Inception ===
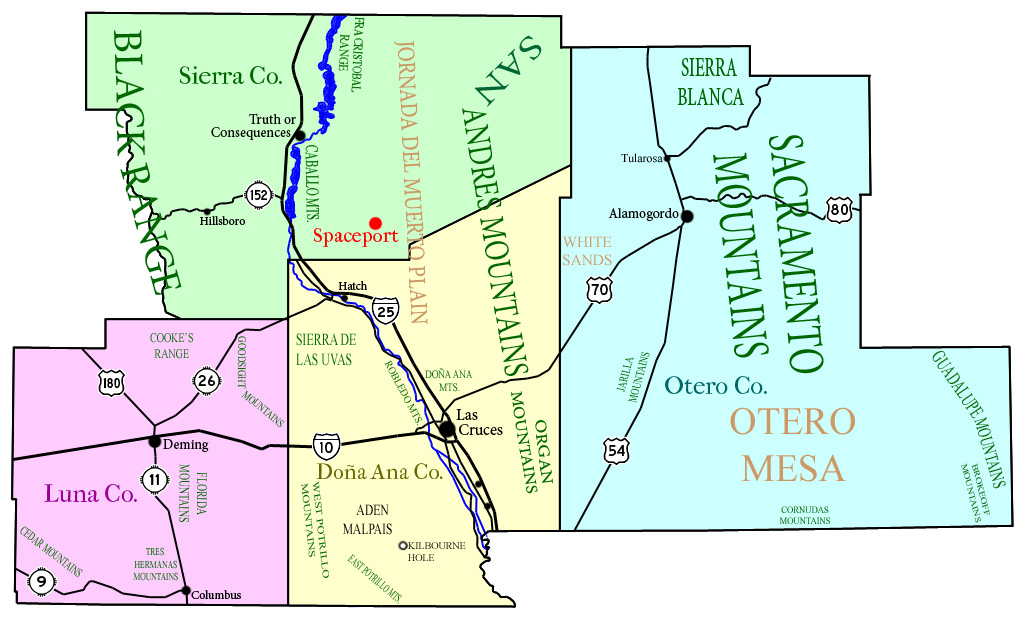
Map of Spaceport America within the originally envisioned spaceport tax district, including Doña Ana, Luna, Otero, and Sierra counties

The spaceport's initial concept was proposed by Stanford University engineering lecturer and tech startup advisor Dr. Burton Lee in 1990. He wrote the initial business and strategic plans, secured US$1.4 million in seed funding via congressional earmarks with the help of Senator Pete Domenici, and worked with the New Mexico State University Physical Science Laboratory (PSL) to develop local support for the spaceport concept.

In 1992, the Southwest Space Task Force was formed to advance New Mexico's space industry's commercial infrastructure and activity. After several years of study, they focused on a 27-square-mile (70 km^{2}) plot of state-owned land, 45 miles (72 km) north of Las Cruces, as a location for the spaceport.

In 2003, the task force petitioned then-new Economic Development Cabinet Secretary Rick Homans who then picked up the torch. Homans presented the idea to then-Governor Bill Richardson and negotiated with the X Prize Foundation to locate the X Prize Cup in New Mexico. Following an announcement by Governor Richardson and Sir Richard Branson that the new Virgin Galactic would make New Mexico its world headquarters, the state legislature enacted laws providing for the world's first purpose-built commercial spaceport in 2006 (compare SpacePort Canada). The spaceport was subsequently named Spaceport America.

=== Construction ===
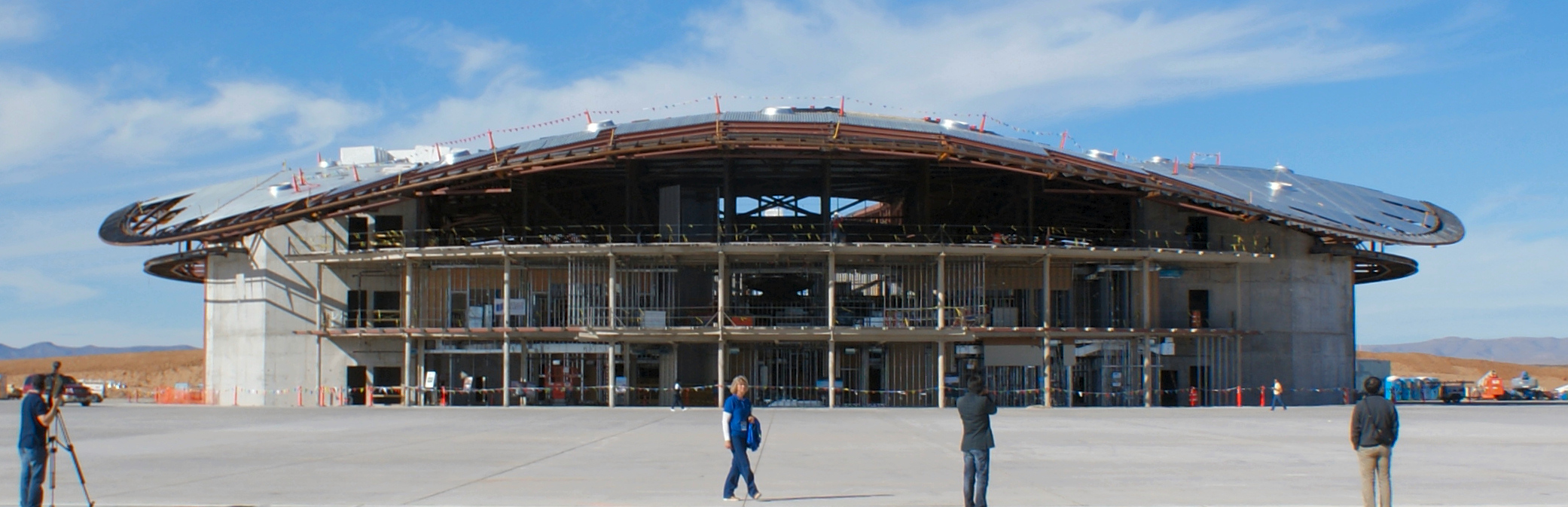
Spaceport America terminal hangar facility as of October 2010

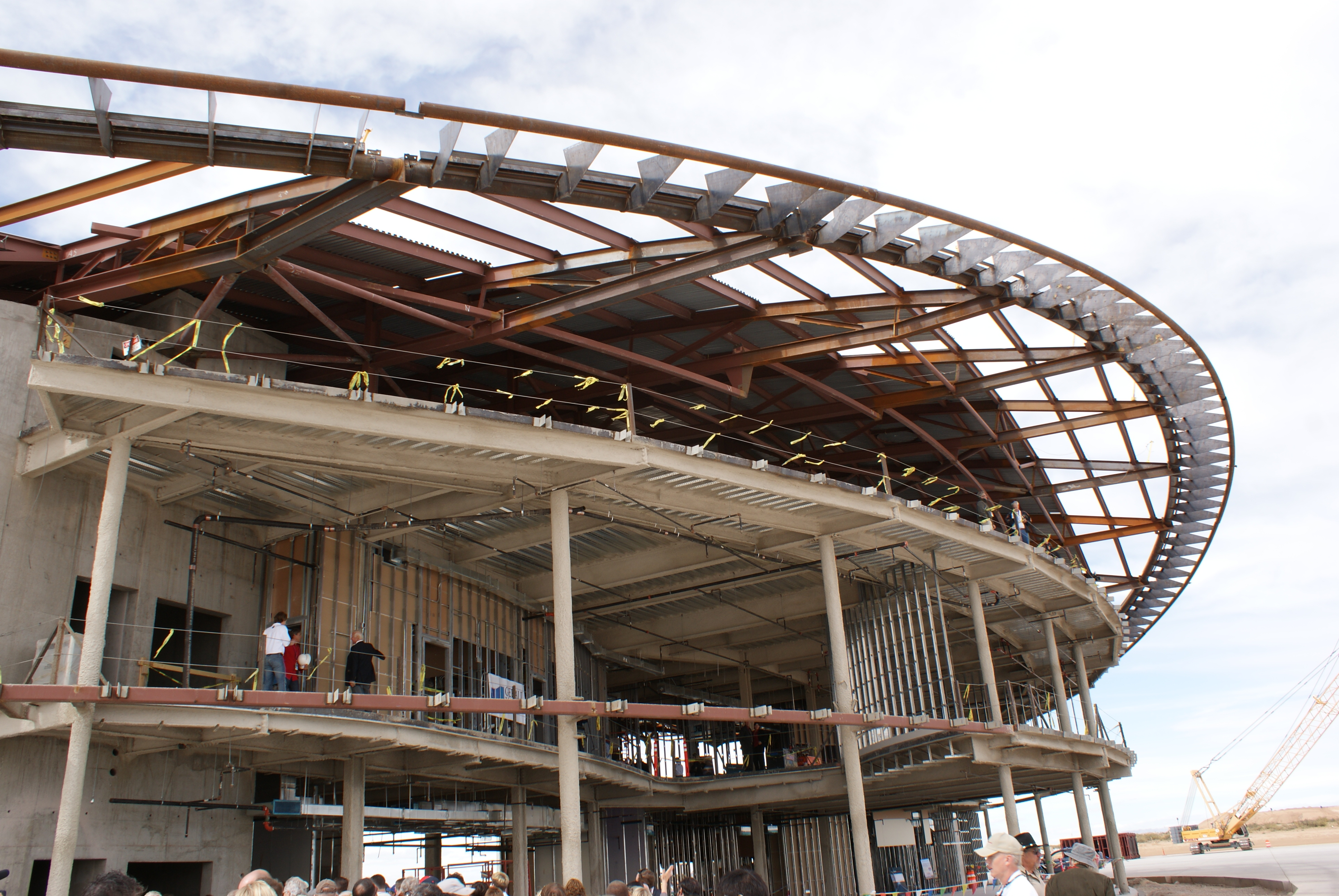
The "Virgin Galactic Gateway to Space" in October 2010

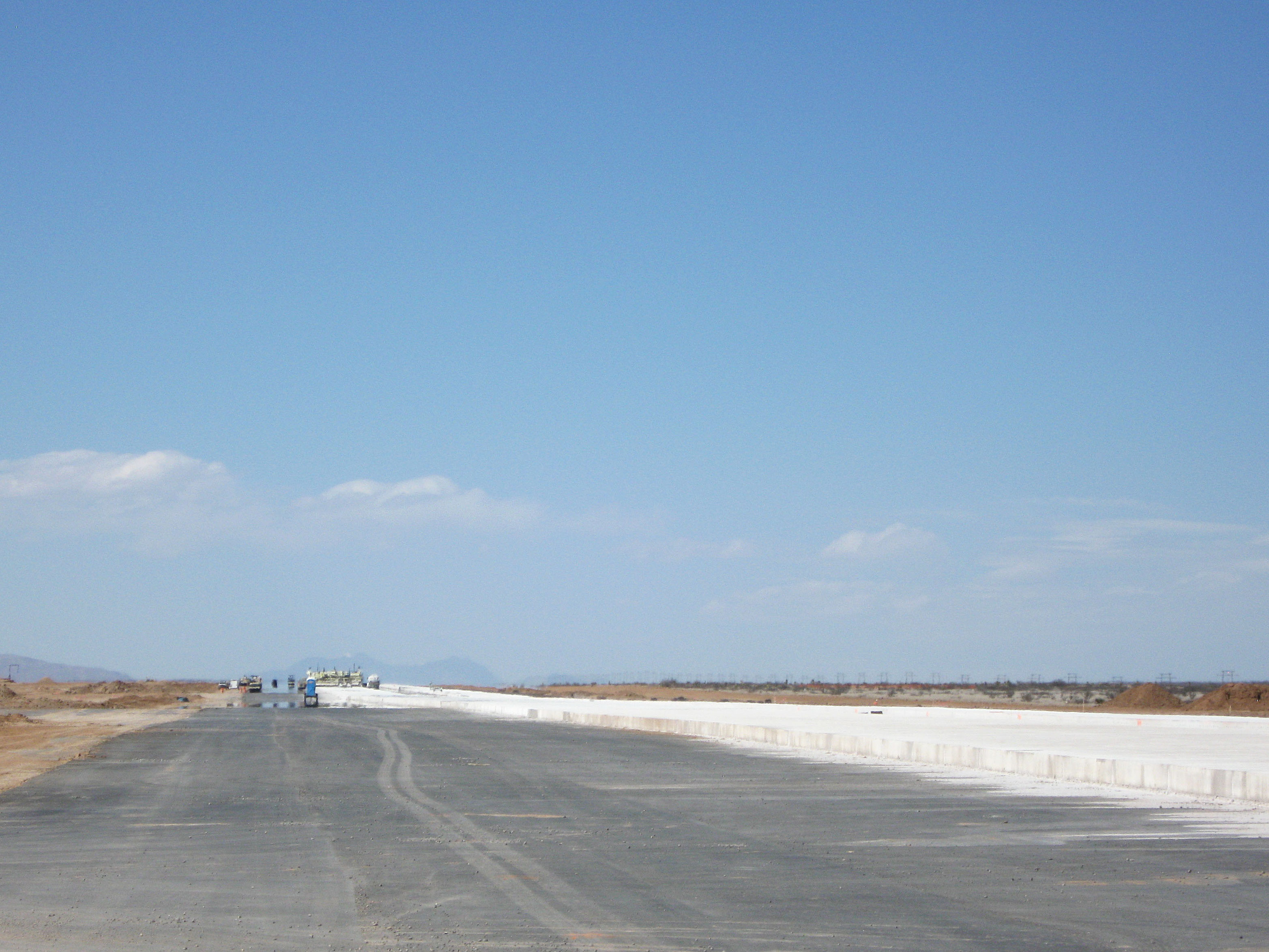
The runway under construction, March 2010

Construction of the first temporary launch facility at the spaceport site in Sierra County began on April 4, 2006. In early 2007, red tape was still in the process of being cleared and the spaceport itself was still little more than "a 100-foot (30 m) by 25-foot (7.6 m) concrete slab." That slab would eventually be part of the launch facility for the spaceport's first tenant UP Aerospace. On April 3, voters in neighboring Doña Ana County approved a spaceport tax that would go into effect upon final approval from Sierra County.

The first images of the then planned spaceport's Hangar Terminal Facility (HTF) were released in early September 2007.

In April 2008, voters in Sierra County approved the plan, releasing over US$40 million in funding for the spaceport. Voters in of Otero County, however, rejected the spaceport tax during general elections in November. In spite of the rejection, Spaceport America had what it needed to move forward and progress toward its completion began.

In December 2008, the New Mexico Spaceport Authority received its launch license for vertical and horizontal launch from the Federal Aviation Administration's Office of Commercial Space Transportation. Shortly thereafter, Virgin Galactic signed a 20-year (240-month) lease as the anchor tenant, agreeing to pay US$1 million per year for the first five years in addition to payments on a tiered scale based on the number of launches the company makes.

In December, Gerald Martin Construction Management, from Albuquerque, was chosen to oversee construction. The goal was to have construction complete by December 2010.

The ground-breaking ceremony took place on June 19, 2009, and paid tours of the facilities began in December of the same year.

By February 2010, the in mid-construction budgetary estimate for completion was $198 million.

On October 22, a ceremonial flypass of Spaceport America was made by SpaceShipTwo to celebrate the completion of the runway.

By October 2010, with the runway complete and the terminal building under active construction, the budgetary estimate for completion increased to $212 million. Approximately two-thirds of that were provided by the state and the remainder from "construction bonds backed by a tax approved by voters in Doña Ana and Sierra counties."

The spaceport was officially declared open on October 18, 2011, but the tenant did not move in and begin operations right away. By August 2011, Spaceport America was substantially complete and the cost of the entire project was $209 million.

The interior of the building was the responsibility of tenant Virgin Galactic, and work on the interior began only in 2018. By August 2019, interior work was complete, and the entire facility was deemed ready for operations.

=== Increased private funding ===
With the inauguration of the administration of Governor Susana Martinez in 2011, the state government took a new approach to increase private investment to complete the spaceport project. In order to oversee the new effort, Governor Martinez appointed an entirely new board of directors for the Spaceport Authority and removed Executive Director Rick Homans.

By 2013, the Spaceport had signed SpaceX as an additional tenant for vertical takeoff and vertical landing flight testing of prototype reusable rockets such as the Falcon 9 Reusable Development Vehicle. The facilities at Spaceport America were never used for Falcon 9 RDV and equipment staged was eventually moved back to Texas.

=== Delays in operation of the anchor tenant ===
Virgin Galactic faced a series of delays in beginning operations at Spaceport America. The multi-year extension of the test program and the re-designed engine of SpaceShipTwo announced in May 2014 were responsible for much of the delay. In 2014, the spaceport announced that it was seeking additional tenants and hoped to sign another one in the next year.

Budgetary difficulties in operating the spaceport became salient in New Mexico politics. The annual cost of providing fire protection services that were contracted for the mostly unused spaceport was approximately US$2.9 million.

The inflight breakup and crash of the first SpaceShipTwo vehicle—VSS Enterprise—in October 2014 raised questions about the future of the spaceport. With further delays to the start of Virgin Galactic commercial operations, at the time projected to at least 2016, the spaceport potentially needed funding from state or local authorities in order to keep the basic fire and security and administrative operation underway. The Spaceport Authority asked the New Mexico legislature in November 2014 for US$1.7 million in emergency funds to maintain operations until 2016, the earliest date at which Virgin was expected to be able to begin commercial flight operations.

SpaceX had also been delayed in initiating test flights of F9R Dev2 at the spaceport from when they were originally anticipated. The F9R Dev2 vehicle was canceled in 2015.

In May 2015, budgetary details made public revealed that the substantially unused spaceport had an annual deficit that had been running approximately US$500,000, with the deficit being made up by state taxpayers. The primary planned revenue in the times of delayed operations by Virgin Galactic and SpaceX, with limited operations by other minor tenants, was local tax revenue, paid by the taxpayers of Sierra and Doña Ana counties.

In May 2019, Virgin Galactic announced that they were ready to relocate all of their spaceflight activities to the spaceport from the Mojave Air and Space Port in Mojave, California. Virgin completed the interior fit out work in mid-2019 and the entire facility was deemed ready for operations in August 2019. WhiteKnightTwo and SpaceShipTwo moved to the Spaceport in February 2020. The operational flights are expected to begin sometime in 2020. In 2019, Infiniti was testing some of its current models at the Spaceport America desert test tracks, such as its Q50 sports sedan and Q60 sports coupe.

On June 25, 2020, Virgin Galactic carried out its second successful glide flight of its spaceship over Spaceport America. The first glide flight took place in May 2020.

In the 2024 analysis of launch site planning, Spaceportopia, the authors describe the potential missed opportunity costs with Spaceport America which has resulted in local citizens and officials being dissatisfied with the use of taxpayer funds.

== Facility ==
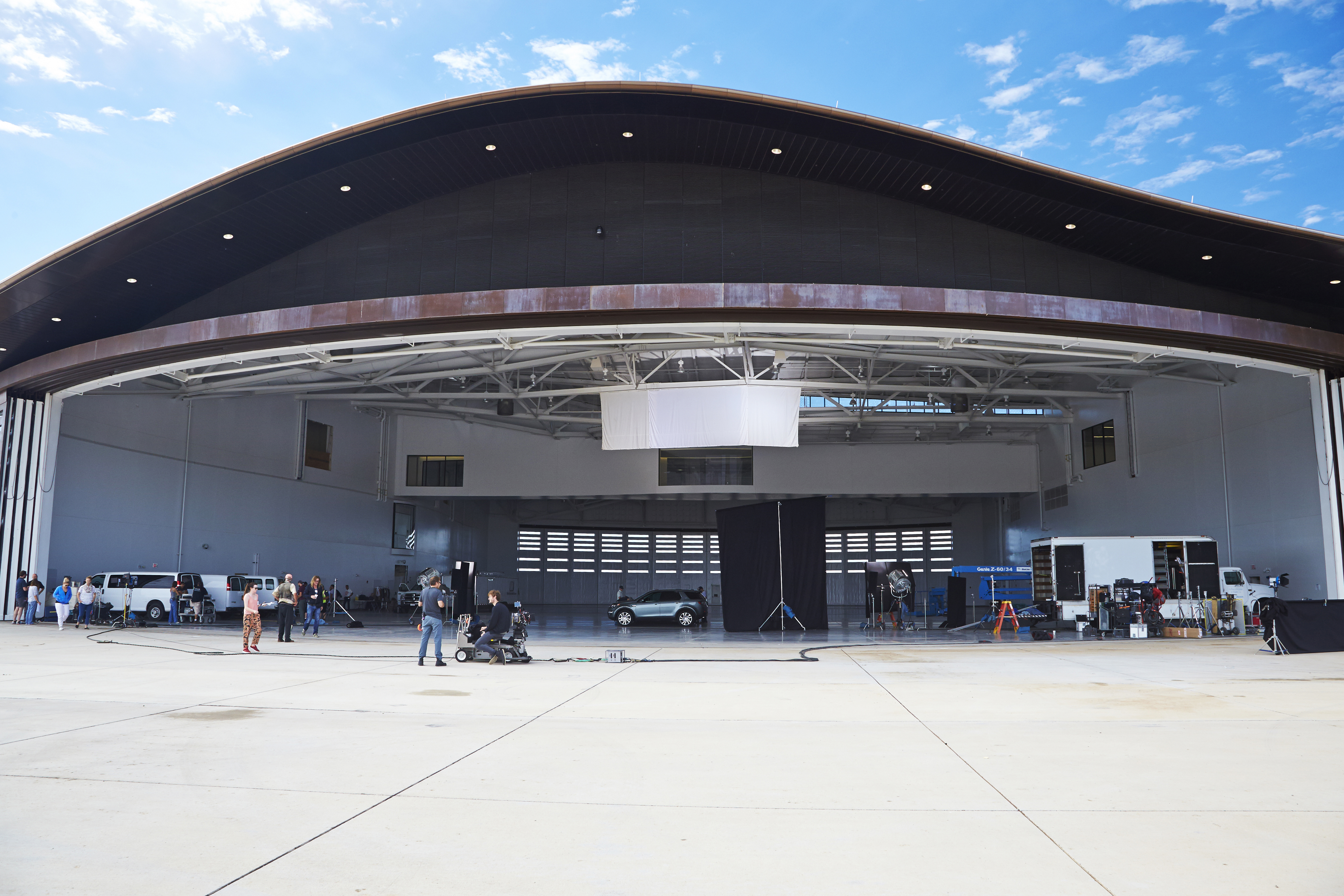
Terminal hangar at the Spaceport America, taken during a Land Rover Discovery Sport photo shoot

The site area nets approximately 670,000 sq ft (62,000 m^{2}), with the terminal & hangar facility grossing an area of 110,152 sq ft (10,233.5 m^{2}).

The western zone of the facility (25,597 square feet (2,378.0 m^{2})) houses support and administrative facilities for Virgin Galactic and the New Mexico Spaceport Authority. The central zone contains the double-height hangar (47,000 square feet (4,400 m^{2})) to store White Knight Two and SpaceShipTwo craft. The eastern zone (29,419 square feet (2,733.1 m^{2})) encompasses the principal operational training area, departure lounge, spacesuit dressing rooms, and celebration areas.

The onsite restaurant and mission control room have direct east views across the apron, runway and landscape beyond.

The spaceport was built with environmental sustainability in mind. Designed to meet the requirements for LEED Gold Certification, it incorporates "Earth Tubes" to cool the building, solar thermal panels, underfloor radiant cooling and heating, and natural ventilation.

A visitor center was planned in downtown Truth or Consequences (the closest town) to provide shuttle bus services to the Spaceport. However, due to delays in spaceport operations and reduction in spaceport authority revenues, the plans were considerably scaled back in January 2014. Rather than the planned US$20 million facilities, the revised plan in January 2014 had only a US$7.5 million capital budget. Rather than the "planned $13 million visitor center at the spaceport [there will be a] $1.5 million hangar" and the Truth or Consequences visitor center budget request was cut to US$6 million from the original US$7 million. By May 2015, news media were reporting that the spaceport authority "spent so much money with a company to design the visitors’ experience that it had no money left over to actually build the facilities for it."

The spaceport is located under FAA Special Use Airspace Restricted Areas 5111A and 5111B. When both these areas are active the airspace is restricted from surface to 'unlimited'.

=== Awards ===
Since its completion in 2014 by Foster+Partners and URS Corporation team, the facility has a LEED-Gold Terminal Hangar facility and has won several awards for its architectural design.

- 2014 Jeff Harner Award for Contemporary Architecture Award
- 2014 American Institute of Architects, Western Mountain Region Merit Award
- American Institute of Architects, Albuquerque Chapter, Merit Award
- American Institute of Architects, 2013 Design Awards Program, New Mexico Student Jury, UNM School of Architecture + Planning
- 2013 American Council of Engineering Companies, Engineering Excellence Award
- NAIOP Award of Excellence, Eagle Award, Industrial Category

=== Genesis ===
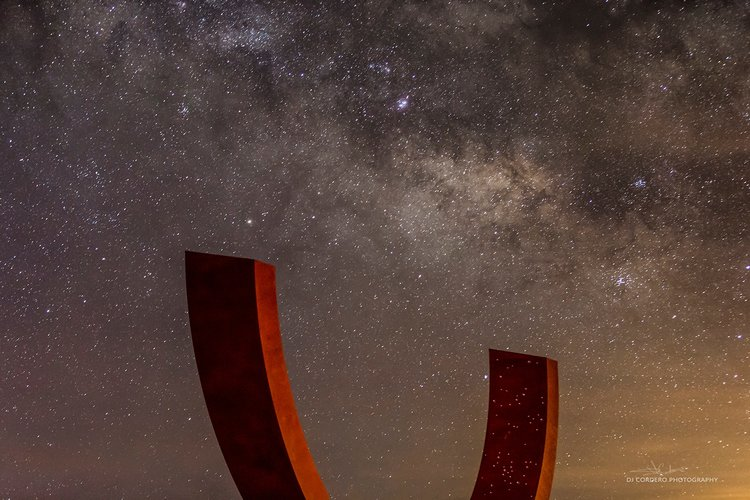
Genesis by Otto Rigan

Created by renowned artist Otto Rigan from Muroc, California, The Genesis is a $200,000, 11,000-pound (5,000 kg), 40 feet (12 m) long by 5 feet (1.5 m) deep steel sculpture that greets visitors at the entrance of Spaceport America. The sculpture was installed in 2015. According to the artist, the sculpture represents “new beginnings.”

The U-shaped arms of the sculpture face upward towards the sky and are detailed with embedded cast glass designed to “represent the stars in the night sky.” The mirrored glass was made to reflect the night sky and respond to the changing light of its environment, the time of day, the seasons, and the light from the night sky.

== Operations ==
As of August 2012, many suborbital flights had been successfully launched from Spaceport America. The primary user is UP Aerospace, with 14 launches of SpaceLoft XL sounding rockets from 2006 to 2021 and 5 launches of prototype vehicles from 2007 to 2009. Boeing, SpinLaunch, HyperSciences, EXOS Aerospace, TMD Defense and Space and White Sands Research and Developers are current tenants.

=== Spaceport revenue ===
In order to repay the construction bonds and eventually meet operating expenses from Spaceport operations, the spaceport authority has forecast a number of revenue streams. These include lease payments, takeoff and launch payments, and tours.

However, anchor tenant Virgin Galactic had paid only US$2.7 million in facility lease payments as of November 2014, and was projected to pay US$50,000 to 100,000 for each six-passenger flight of SpaceShipTwo once flight operations begin. Due to continued long-term revenue shortfalls, the Spaceport Authority is "working on a business plan that would further expand the search for revenue sources beyond Virgin Galactic ...[targeting] new tenants, including other space ventures, commercial projects, tourism, special events and merchandising."

=== Spaceport America Cup ===
From 2017 to 2024, the Experimental Sounding Rocket Association (ESRA) held its annual Intercollegiate Rocket Engineering Competition (IREC) at the Spaceport, during which time the competition was known as the Spaceport America Cup. After the conclusion of the 2024 IREC, ESRA announced that the event would move to Midland, Texas and revert to its original IREC branding.

=== Spaceport current tenants and operators ===
==== Current tenants ====
===== AeroVironment/HAPSMobile =====
HAPSMobile is currently testing a prototype high altitude, long endurance UAV and associated cellular-like communication equipment.

===== SpinLaunch =====
December 15, 2020, SpinLaunch announced that it would be expanding its operations to Spaceport America. SpinLaunch is creating an evacuated centrifuge roughly 30 meters in diameter and was expected to perform its first suborbital test on a prototype of its centrifugal kinetic accelerator system that will launch small satellites at the site in 2021.

===== UP Aerospace =====
UP Aerospace is a space launch and flight test service provider specializing in advanced engineering, launch technology development, and state-of-the-art rapid and low-cost launch operations. The company provides suborbital launch services to customers such as NASA, Department of Defense (DoD), educational institutions, and the private sector. In 2013, SatWest company led by Brian Barnett sent the first commercial text message to space, using a UP Aerospace rocket launched from Spaceport America funded by NASA's Flight Opportunities Program. The technology has been incorporated into Solstar Space products. Since 2017, UPA has manufactured their solid rocket motors at Spaceport America. UPA also has conducted launches of third-party rockets for Lockheed Martin and Moog.

===== Virgin Galactic =====
Virgin Galactic is an American spaceflight company developing a suborbital spaceflight tourism program. Their spaceflight program have made New Mexico the third state to host human space flight after California and Florida. Virgin Galactic has recently reported a future of two carrier ships and three spaceships with 400 launches a year. conducts launches of student designed and fabricated suborbital rock. On March 30, 2021, Virgin Galactic unveiled its new suborbital spaceplane "Spaceship III". A flight test program was planned to begin in the summer of 2021.

==== Current operators ====
===== ABL Space =====
ABL Space now has about 105 employees, with about 90,000 square feet (8,400 m^{2}) of space in several buildings in El Segundo, California, as well as testing facilities at Edwards Air Force Base and Spaceport America. RS1 Rocket was developed for high-cadence orbital launches, by combining simple and modern architectures manufacturing processes.

===== EXOS Aerospace =====
EXOS is conducting developmental test flights of liquid fuel suborbital launch vehicles with the goal of transitioning their vehicles to operational status and supporting space research objectives of their customers. EXOS launches are licensed by the FAA. The company is an outgrowth of Armadillo Aerospace.

===== Swift Engineering =====
Swift Engineering is testing a prototype high altitude, long endurance UAV.

===== White Sands Research and Developers, LLC =====
WSRDs have a small launch vehicle currently capable of reaching altitudes as high as 60,000 feet (18,000 m) depending on propulsion. The company intends to use this vehicle to support third party research requirements including hybrid engine development and high-G testing.

===== WSMR (Boeing) =====
As part of a WSMR program, launches of large, high altitude balloons are conducted from Spaceport America for the purpose of testing the parachute recovery system of the Boeing CST-100 capsule. Three launches have been conducted from Spaceport America and up to two additional flights have been conducted in the fourth quarter of CY 2020.

=== Past tenants and operators ===
==== Sugarhouse Aerospace ====
Sugarhouse was a suborbital, solid fuel rocket for the purpose of supporting space research by their customer base.

==== SpaceX F9R ====
SpaceX developed a launch site for testing their reusable first stage recovery methodology. After the loss of the first F9R Dev vehicle, the F9R Dev2 article planned for usage at Spaceport America was never completed, and no flights were made at Spaceport America.

==== Google Skybender ====
Google flight tested technology for deploying cellular-like communications equipment on aircraft. Test equipment was deployed on a conventional aircraft modified to be optionally-piloted. The Ultimate system would have been deployed on solar-powered high altitude UAVs.

==== Facebook Aquila ====
Facebook Aquila was developing technology for deploying cellular-like communications equipment on aircraft and intended to test first the aircraft (solar powered UAV), and then the full communication system. Customer canceled program as a result of aircraft development problems, although ground had been broken on Spaceport America facilities.

==== Energetic X Inc. ====
Spaceport America has hosted two sessions of testing launch technology using ram accelerator technology to accelerate projectiles to high velocities.

==== Boeing Helicopters ====
Boeing Helicopters tested helicopter auto-landing technology on moving platforms. An aircraft equipped with the technology under test made numerous landings on platform as it was towed along the Spaceport America runway.

==== Armadillo Aerospace ====
Armadillo Aerospace conducted developmental test flights of liquid fuel suborbital launch vehicles. Launches in late 2012 and early 2013 of their STIG B vehicle were licensed by the FAA.

==== New Mexico Space Grant Consortium ====
The NMSGC partnered with a Las Cruces based amateur rocket club to launch K-12 student payloads to approximately 10,000 ft for conducting a variety of simple experiments. In 2009–2014, NMSGC also partnered with UP Aerospace to carry student payloads to much high altitudes on dedicated launches or mixed with other payloads. These launches are considered to be UP Aerospace launches.

==== SemQuest, Inc. ====
SemQuest launched a series of small rockets for the purpose of developing and testing target rockets for laser weapon testing.

==== Princeton University ====
Spaceport America hosted launches of a Princeton University student launch vehicle program with the goal of reaching the Kármán Line with a two-stage rocket.

==== Infiniti ====
In 2019, Infiniti was testing some of its current models at the Spaceport America desert test tracks, such as its Q50 sports sedan and Q60 sports coupe.

==== C6 Launch Systems ====
In Spring 2021, Canadian based company, C6 Launch Systems conducted a static engine test at the Spaceport America Vertical launch area (VLA)

=== Education outreach ===
Spaceport America promotes educational involvement in grade school and universities through activities, educational materials and training aimed at promoting science, technology, engineering, and mathematics (STEM). STEM is an initiative started by the New Mexico Spaceport Authority team to engage with students.

==== New Mexico State University ====
The ATOMIC Aggies program is mostly composed of mechanical and aerospace engineering students from New Mexico State University (NMSU). Each year the Atomic Aggies allow a student to build and design their own rocket in order to get the Level 3 certification which shows judges at the Spaceport America Cup that the team is experienced with the larger class motors.

==== University of Southern California ====
A current operator at Spaceport America, the University of Southern California (USC) is currently conducting launches of increasingly ambitious rockets with the goal of reaching the Kármán Line. On the last such launch to date, the rocket is believed to have achieved this goal.

==== New Mexico Institute of Mining and Technology ====
The New Mexico Institute of Mining and Technology (NMIMT) conducts launches of student designed and fabricated suborbital rockets as part of its engineering instructional program.

==== Spaceport America Cup ====
The Spaceport America Cup is designed in conjunction with the Intercollegiate Rocket Engineering Competition (IREC) for student rocketry teams from all over the country and around the world. With over 150 teams from colleges and universities in eleven countries, the competition continues to grow every year. Students launched solid, liquid, and hybrid rockets to target altitudes of 10,000 and 30,000 feet (3,000 and 9,100 m).

In 2021, the Spaceport America Cup was held virtually, due to the COVID-19 pandemic.

==== Spaceport America Podcast ====
The Spaceport America Podcast is the official podcast for Spaceport America. It is hosted by Alice Carruth, the PR coordinator for the New Mexico Spaceport Authority (NMSA).

== See also ==
- List of spaceports
- Spacefaring
