= Philip K. Chapman =

Australian-born American astronaut (1935–2021)

Philip Chapman
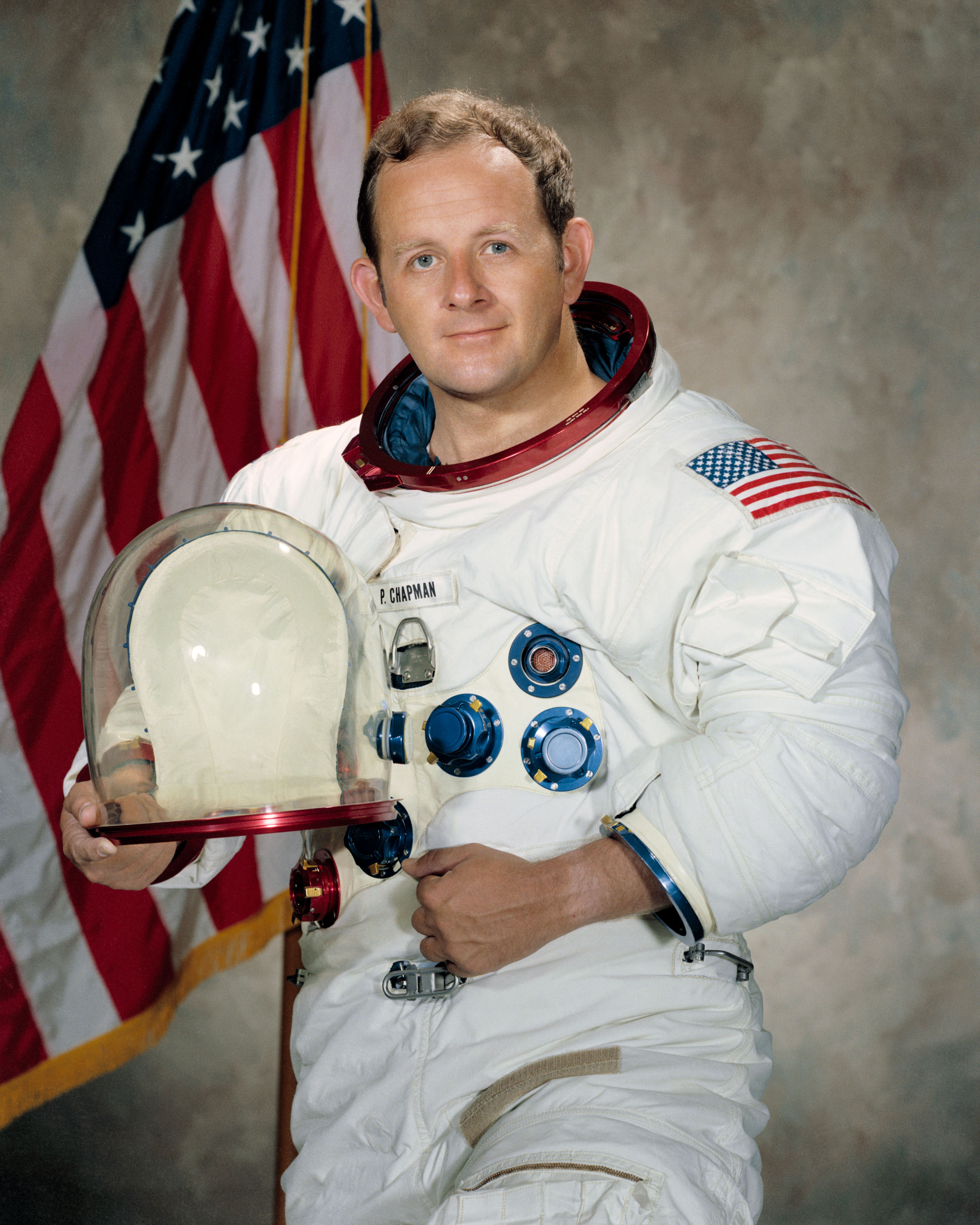
- Chapman in 1971
- Born: Philip Kenyon Chapman; March 5, 1935; Melbourne, Victoria, Australia
- Died: April 5, 2021 (aged 86); Scottsdale, Arizona, U.S.
- Education: University of Sydney (BS); Massachusetts Institute of Technology (MS, ScD)
- Space career

NASA astronaut
- Selection: NASA Group 6 (1967)
- Scientific career
- Fields: Physics
- Thesis: Theoretical Foundations of Gravitational Experiments in Space (1967)
- Doctoral advisors: Steven Weinberg; Rainer Weiss

Philip Kenyon Chapman (5 March 1935 – 5 April 2021) was an Australian-born American astronaut, serving for about five years in NASA Astronaut Group 6 (1967).

== Education ==
Born in Melbourne, Australia, Chapman's family moved to Sydney while he was a child. After attending the Fort Street Opportunity School (which Douglas Mawson also attended), Chapman attended Parramatta High School. He went on to earn a B.S. in physics and mathematics from the University of Sydney, in 1956. He then attended the Massachusetts Institute of Technology in the United States, earning a M.S. in aeronautics and astronautics in 1964 and a Sc.D. in instrumentation in 1967. His doctoral thesis advisors included Nobel Laureates Steven Weinberg and Rainer Weiss.

== Work ==
Chapman served with the Royal Australian Air Force Reserve from 1953 to 1955. He learned to fly (in a Tiger Moth) during Australian National Service.

From 1956 to 1957, Chapman worked for Philips Electronics Industries Proprietary Limited in Sydney, Australia. He then spent 15 months at Mawson Station, Antarctica with the Australian National Antarctic Research Expeditions (ANARE), for the International Geophysical Year (IGY), 1958, as an auroral/radio physicist. The work required that he spend most of the winter at a remote, 2-man base, near the world's largest Emperor penguin rookery, near Taylor Glacier. Chapman explored the local area, being the first human to climb Chapman Ridge which he and his team members called Mount Rumdoodle.

From 1960 to 1961, Chapman was an electro-optics staff engineer in flight simulators for Canadian Aviation Electronics Limited in Dorval, Quebec. His next assignment was as a staff physicist at the Massachusetts Institute of Technology, where he worked in electro-optics, inertial systems at the Experimental Astronomy Lab, under the direction of Charles Stark "Doc" Draper, and gravitational theory with Rainer Weiss until the summer of 1967.

After gaining U.S. citizenship, Chapman was selected as a scientist-astronaut by NASA in August 1967. He trained as an astronaut, including jet pilot training with the USAF and the US Navy Underwater School; he also served on the support crew for Apollo 14 as Mission Scientist.

Chapman resigned from the program near the close of the Apollo Program in July 1972, largely because he strongly disagreed with the decision to build the Space Shuttle. Publicly, he said, "It appears that we have to make a choice between losing our competency as pilots or losing our competency as scientists."

After spending the next five years working on laser propulsion at Avco Everett Research Laboratory as the special assistant to Arthur Kantrowitz, Chapman moved to Arthur D. Little to work with Peter Glaser, the inventor of the solar power satellite (SPS). Chapman was actively involved in the NASA/DOE SPS Concept Development and Evaluation Program (CDEP) in the late 1970s and early 1980s and has since continued to make contributions to the literature on power from space.

In the mid-1980s, Chapman shifted his focus to commercial space—building private companies that develop products and services for space-based, as well as Earth-oriented businesses. He served as president of the L5 Society (now the National Space Society) during the successful campaign to stop the US Senate from ratifying the Moon Treaty, which would have excluded any commercial activity on the Moon.

Chapman was a member of the Citizens' Advisory Council on National Space Policy, which has advised several US Presidents on space-related issues. In particular, a position paper by the council was instrumental in convincing Ronald Reagan that it was technically feasible to intercept ballistic missiles in flight. Opponents thought the Strategic Defense Initiative (SDI) was a fantasy, dubbing it "Star Wars".

In 1989, Chapman led a privately funded scientific expedition by sea from Cape Town, South Africa to Enderby Land, Antarctica, to gather information about mineral resources before the Madrid Protocol to the Antarctic Treaty made prospecting illegal on the continent.

From 1989–1994, Chapman was the president of Echo Canyon Software in Boston which produced the first visual programming environment for Windows, before Microsoft introduced Visual Basic.

In 1998, Chapman was Chief Scientist of Rotary Rocket of San Mateo, California. Rotary Rocket built and flew atmospheric tests of the Roton, a novel crewed, re-usable space launch vehicle.

In 2004, Chapman presented two papers at the 55th International Astronautical Congress (Vancouver CANADA). The first, "Luces in the Sky with Diamonds," presented a design for a gossamer, iso-inertial SPS using thin films of artificial diamond in thermionic conversion devices. The second paper, "Power from Space and the Hydrogen Economy," discussed the implications of the recent discovery of vast deposits of methane hydrates under Arctic permafrost and on continental shelves, which may be sufficient to meet all world energy needs for many thousands of years. See the web address below for full text of this paper.

Chapman was Chief Scientist of Transformational Space Corporation, "t/Space" of Reston, VA. Under a $6 million contract from NASA, t/Space developed a plan and re-usable vehicle to support the International Space Station (ISS) for after the shuttle's retirement in 2011. The Roton is a crewed spacecraft that is owned and operated by private enterprise. NASA has now adopted commercial support as its baseline plan for the ISS.

In 2009, Chapman formed the Solar High Study Group, "a team of senior managers and technologists with directly relevant experience who believe that space-based solar power can solve the problem of bringing clean, affordable energy to people anywhere on Earth or in space." In July 2010, Chapman presented slides to the US Air Force on the topic of Tactical and Strategic Implications of Space-Based Solar Power (SBSP). Main conclusions include the US is able to deploy SBSP within 7 years with technologies now at Technology Readiness Level 6+ and that a study of national security implications of SBSP is urgently needed. Information from this event will contribute to a USAF policy paper on its energy strategy.

== Views on global warming ==
On 23 April 2008, Chapman authored an op-ed in The Australian newspaper, noting a new ice age will eventually occur, that based on current low solar activity it might even be imminent, and "It is time to put aside the global warming dogma, at least to begin contingency planning about what to do if we are moving into another little ice age, similar to the one that lasted from 1100 to 1850." A response by IPCC affiliated meteorologist David Karoly was published a few days later.

Chapman wrote a blog that included 17 entries categorized as Global Warming. Those entries presented much data and commentary to support his point of view.

== Honorary positions ==
- Advisor to the Space Frontier Foundation

== Biography ==
Chapman's career is chronicled in the book NASA's Scientist-Astronauts by David Shayler and Colin Burgess, the book Shattered Dreams, and in many articles and books.

Chapman's NASA years are also described in Australia's Astronauts: Three Men and a Spaceflight Dream, 1999, by Colin Burgess.

Chapman died on 5 April 2021, at the age of 86. On January 8, 2024, a sample of Chapman's cremated remains was launched aboard the maiden flight of ULA's Vulcan Centaur. The payload included the lunar lander Peregrine with the ashes of Arthur C. Clarke to be deposited on the Moon. The third stage payload included the Celestis vessel "Enterprise", which contained the ashes of Philip K. Chapman, as well as copies of DNA fragments from four US presidents, including DNA from US President John F. Kennedy, who launched NASA's Apollo Program. On board were also the remains of several members of the original cast of the TV program, Star Trek.

Plans were for Enterprise to embark on a 2.5 year mission that would stabilize in a helio-centric orbit between the Earth and Venus and would remain there thru the Sun's senescence. When stabilized in a helio-centric orbit, the vehicle would have been renamed "Enterprise Station" to signify its contents of the first ever human remains in deep space.

Unfortunately, Peregrine Mission One, which carried the Celestis "Enterprise" payload, suffered a propellant leak shortly after separation from its Vulcan Centaur launch vehicle. After six days in orbit, the spacecraft was redirected into Earth's atmosphere, where it burned up over the Pacific Ocean on 18 January 2024 to avoid creating unnecessary space debris.

== Partial bibliography ==
- Chapman, P. K.; Ezekiel, S. (1964). A sensitive cryogenic accelerometer. Cambridge, Massachusetts: Massachusetts Institute of Technology, Experimental Astronomy Laboratory. OCLC 14252019.
- Chapman, P. K. (1964). A cryogenic test-mass suspension for a sensitive accelerometer. Cambridge, Massachusetts: M.I.T. Experimental Astronomy Laboratory. OCLC 14266324.
- Chapman, P. K. (1962). Final report on Project Skylight. Cambridge, Massachusetts: Massachusetts Institute of Technology, Experimental Astronomy Laboratory. OCLC 14252244.
- Chapman, Philip K. (30 May 2003). "Space Beyond The Cold War". Space Daily.
- Chapman, Philip K. (30 May 2003). "The Failure of NASA: And A Way Out". Space Daily.

== See also ==
- List of astronauts by name
- List of astronauts by selection
- Timeline of astronauts by nationality
- List of human spaceflights
