= Kaish =

Kaish is a surname. Notable people with the surname include:

- Luise Clayborn Kaish (1925–2013), American artist
- Morton Kaish (born 1927), American artist
