= Syracuse Orange =

Collegiate athletic teams that represent Syracuse University

- University: Syracuse University
- Nickname: Orange
- NCAA: Division I (FBS)
- Conference: Atlantic Coast Conference (primary); AHA (women's ice hockey); EARC (men's rowing)
- Athletic director: Bryan Blair
- Location: Syracuse, New York
- Varsity teams: 20
- Football stadium: JMA Wireless Dome
- Basketball arena: JMA Wireless Dome; Melo Center
- Ice hockey arena: Tennity Ice Skating Pavilion; J.S. Coyne Stadium (Field Hockey)
- Softball stadium: Skytop Softball Stadium
- Soccer stadium: SU Soccer Stadium
- Aquatics center: The Arch
- Lacrosse stadium: JMA Wireless Dome
- Golf course: Drumlins Country Club
- Rowing venue: Ten Eyck boathouse
- Sailing venue: Willow Bank Yacht Club
- Tennis venue: Skytop Tennis Complex
- Outdoor track and field venue: Coyne Field
- Other venues: John A. Lally Athletics Complex; Hookway Fields Complex; Women's Building
- Colors: Orange
- Mascot: Otto the Orange
- Fight song: Down the Field
- Website: cuse.com
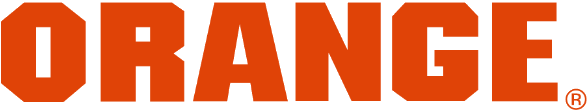

Atlantic Coast Conference logo in Syracuse's colors

The Syracuse Orange are the athletic teams that represent Syracuse University. The school is a member of NCAA Division I and the Atlantic Coast Conference. Until 2013, Syracuse was a member of the Big East Conference.

The school's mascot is Otto the Orange. Until 2004, the teams were known as the Orangemen and Orangewomen. The men's basketball, football, wrestling, men's lacrosse, and women's basketball teams play in the JMA Wireless Dome, referred to as the JMA Dome. Other sports facilities include the nearby John A. Lally Athletics Complex, the Tennity Ice Skating Pavilion, and Drumlins Country Club.

== Important firsts ==
- Baseball team established: 1870
- Rowing team founded: 1874
- First recorded football game: 1884 vs. Medical College of Syracuse
- First intercollegiate football game: 1889 vs. University of Rochester
- First recorded basketball game: 1899 vs. Christian Association of Hamilton (Ontario)
- Lacrosse team founded: 1916
- First United States Intercollegiate Lacrosse Association championship: 1920
- First National Championship: Football, 1959 vs. Texas
- First ACC Championship: Men's Cross Country, 2013
- First Women's National Championship: Field Hockey, 2015

== Sports sponsored ==
Men's sports	Women's sports
Basketball	Basketball
Cross country	Cross country
Football	Field hockey
Lacrosse	Ice hockey
Rowing	Lacrosse
Soccer	Rowing
Track and field^{†}	Soccer
	Softball
	Tennis
	Track and field^{†}
	Volleyball
† – Track and field includes both indoor and outdoor

Syracuse is one of only five Power 5 schools that do not sponsor baseball, the other four being Colorado, Iowa State, SMU and Wisconsin.

=== Football ===
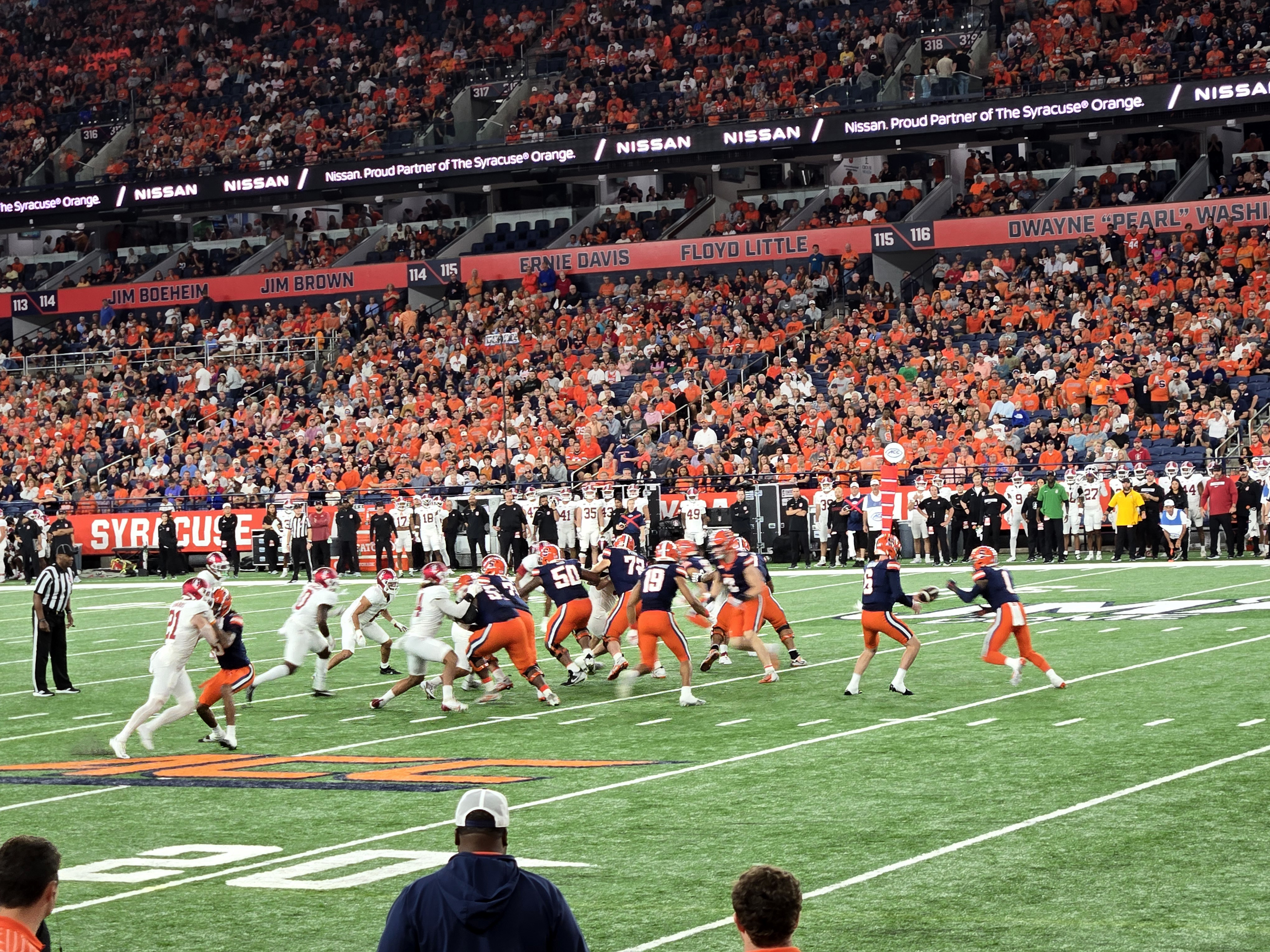
Syracuse football team in 2024

The Syracuse Orange football program is a college football team that currently represents Syracuse University as a member of the Atlantic Coast Conference.

The Syracuse University football program is also renowned for producing many All-Americans and Professionals as well as Pro Football Hall of Famers. Among them are Ernie Davis, Jim Brown, Larry Csonka, Joe Morris, Art Monk, Jim Ringo, John Mackey, Doc Alexander, and Floyd Little. Among the current NFL players are Chandler Jones, Alton Robinson, Zaire Franklin, Andre Cisco, Ifeatu Melifonwu, and Riley Dixon.

=== Men's basketball ===
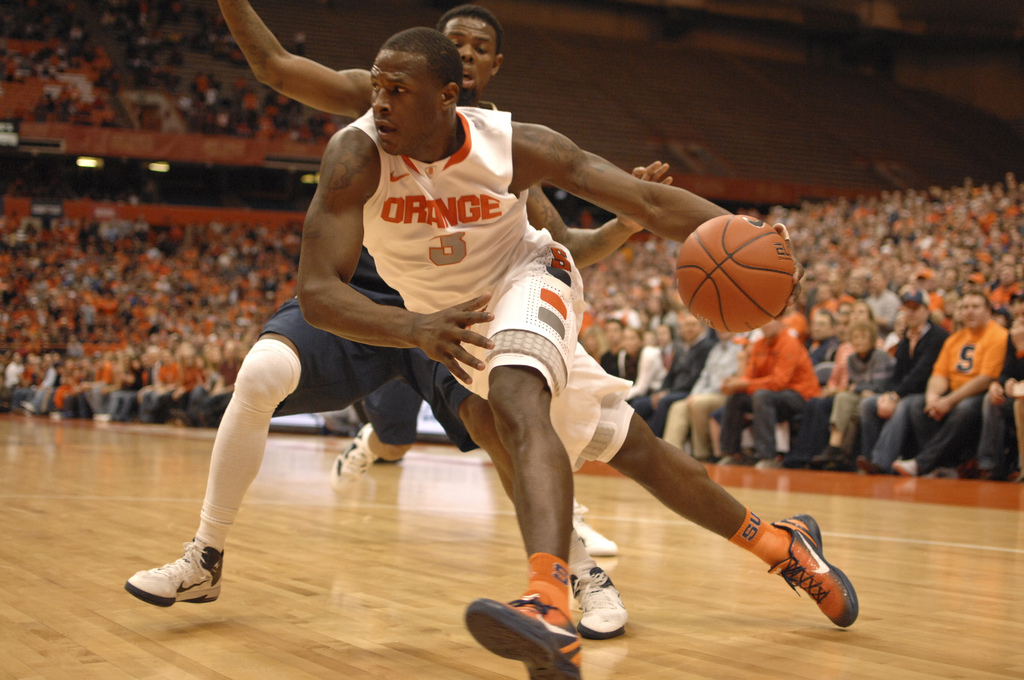
Syracuse Orange men's basketball (Dion Waiters)

The Syracuse Orange men's basketball program is the intercollegiate men's basketball program of Syracuse University. The program is classified in the NCAA's Division I, and the team competes in the Atlantic Coast Conference. The Orange won the National Championship in the 2003 NCAA Men's Division I Basketball tournament. During the 2008–09, they played in, and won, a six-overtime thriller against a rival UConn team.

The game was during the Big East Championship Tournament, and is the second-longest NCAA Division I basketball game of all time. Their recent success has included a trip to the 2013 Final Four and the 2016 Final Four. In the 2013–14 season they broke a record set two years prior by starting the season 25–0. The previous record was 20–0 set during the 2011–12 season. The 1917–18 and 1925–26 Syracuse teams were retroactively named the national champion by the Helms Athletic Foundation and the Premo-Porretta Power Poll.

=== Women's basketball ===
The Syracuse Orange women's basketball program is the intercollegiate women's basketball of Syracuse University. The program is classified in the NCAA's Division I, and the team competes in the Atlantic Coast Conference. The head coach of the team is Felisha Legette-Jack. The team began playing in the 1971–72 season.

=== Women's ice hockey ===
In 2008, Syracuse University announced that it would sanction a women's ice hockey team and become a member of the women-only College Hockey America (CHA). The team started playing in 2008.

After the 2023–24 season, CHA merged with the men-only Atlantic Hockey Association to form Atlantic Hockey America. All members of both predecessor conferences were brought into the new league.

=== Cross Country ===
==== Men's Cross Country ====
Syracuse won the NCAA Men's Cross Country team title in 1951.

At the 2015 NCAA Division I cross country championships Syracuse won its second NCAA team title with a score of 82 points, beating out Colorado (91) and Stanford (151). Syracuse was led by Justyn Knight (4th), Colin Bennie (8th), and Martin Hehir (9th), and an All-American performance from Philo Germano (39th) secured the victory. Joel Hubbard (47th) rounded out the scoring for the Orange. The coaching staff included Brien Bell, Adam Smith and Head Coach Chris Fox, who was subsequently named USTFCCCA National Men's Coach of the Year.

At the ACC Championships, The Syracuse men's cross country team has finished first or second at this meet in 10 of their 11 seasons in the league, including six league titles (2013, 2014, 2015, 2016, 2017, 2019). They joined the league in 2013 and won their first 5 ACC titles. Before then, they won the 2012 Big East Cross Country Championship.

=== Men's lacrosse ===
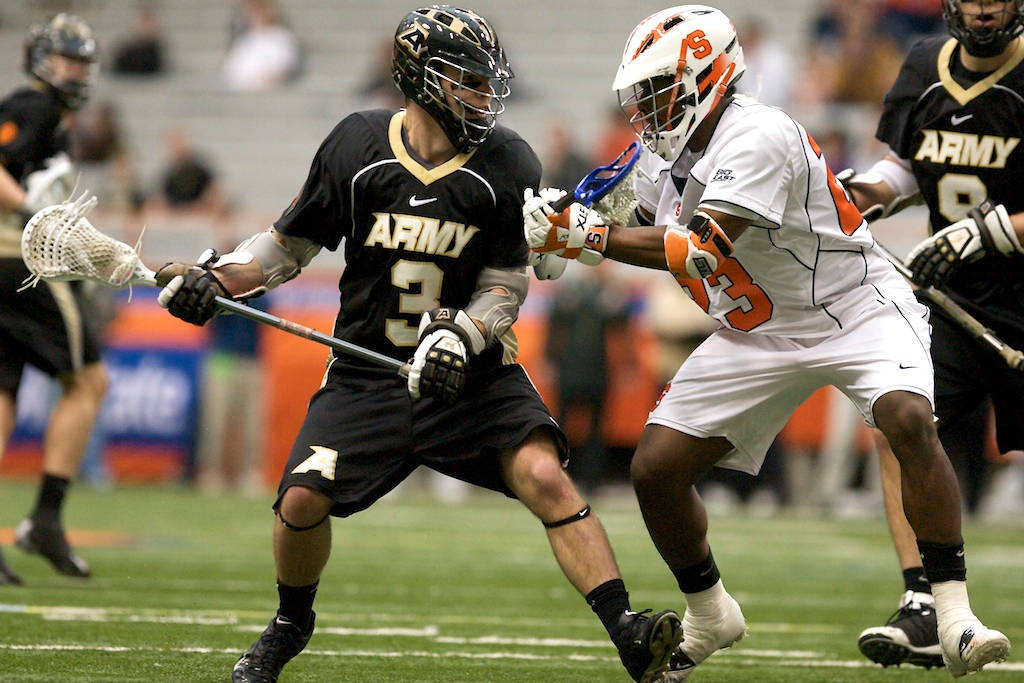
Syracuse Orange men's lacrosse, vs. Army, 2010

Syracuse fields a Division I NCAA college lacrosse team. Syracuse played its first intercollegiate lacrosse game in 1916, and captured its first USILL division championship in 1920. It would go on to win USILL championships in 1922, 1924, and 1925 and the USILA Division II co-national championship (Laurie Cox Trophy) in 1954. In the modern NCAA era, Syracuse has won ten national championships, with one additional championship (1990) vacated due to rules infractions. The Orange's ten national championship titles are the most of any team in NCAA Division I history. Most recently, Syracuse won the 2009 National Championship in a come-from-behind 10–9 overtime victory against Cornell University. Prior to that year, they won in 2008.

=== Softball ===
The Orange softball team began play in 2000. The team has made three NCAA Tournament appearances in 2010, 2011, 2012. The current head coach is Shannon Doepking.

=== Soccer ===
==== Men's soccer ====
Syracuse Orange men's soccer team are a Division I team in the Atlantic Coast Conference and play their games at the Syracuse Soccer Stadium. Syracuse is currently coached by Ian McIntyre who has brought the team to three NCAA tournament appearances and two ACC Conference Titles in 2015 and 2022. McIntyre was named the ACC Coach of the Year in 2014 and 2022.

The Orange won the National Championship in the 2022 NCAA Division I men's soccer tournament under coach Ian McIntyre.

==== Women's soccer ====
Syracuse Orange is the NCAA Division I women's college soccer team for Syracuse University in Syracuse, New York. They play in the Atlantic Coast Conference and play their games at the Syracuse Soccer Stadium. The team was founded in 1996.

== Notable non-varsity sports ==
=== Baseball ===
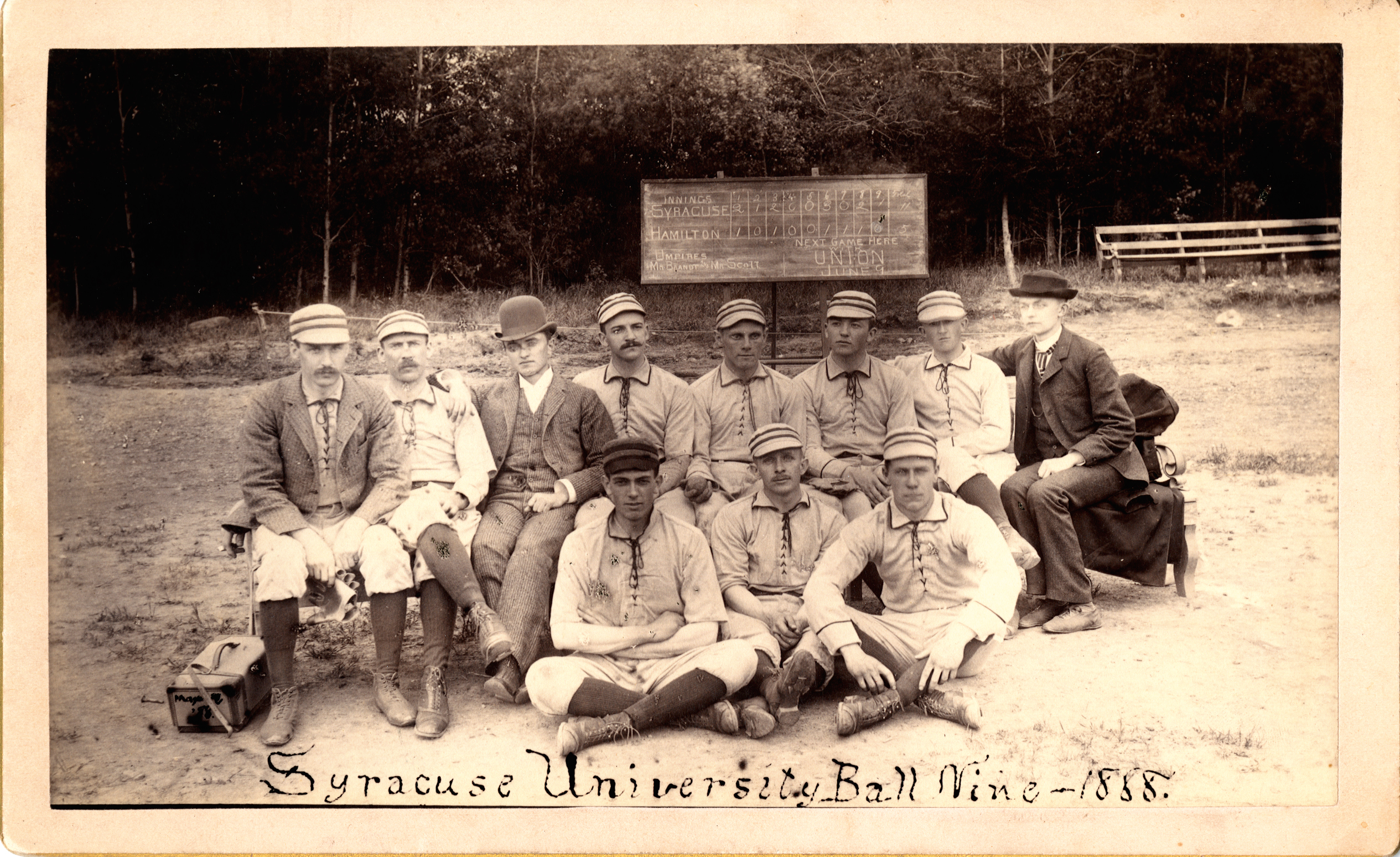
Syracuse University baseball team, the "Ball Nine" in 1888

Syracuse's club baseball team was established in 1979 and has been successful in tournaments. The sport is currently played at the club level and the team is part of the National Club Baseball Association (NCBA).

Many students, alumni, citizens and other baseball enthusiasts in the area are in favor of an NCAA varsity team being formed on campus, but the athletic budget is a difficult barrier. In a September 12, 2006, story in The Daily Orange, Michael Wasylenko, chairman of the Athletic Policy Board, said Title IX and Syracuse's athletic budget is still a major crutch.

=== Men's ice hockey ===
Men's ice hockey competes at the ACHA Division I level in the ESCHL league. The team has been on campus for over 60 years. They play out of the on-campus ice rink, The Tennity Ice Pavilion.

=== Rugby ===
Founded in 1969, Syracuse University Rugby Football Club plays in Division 1 in the Empire Conference. Syracuse has enjoyed success, including a trip to the Division 1 sweet 16 national playoffs in 2010. Syracuse has participated in international tours to Europe, Argentina and Australia. Syracuse are led by program director Colin O'Hare.

== Facilities ==
=== JMA Wireless Dome ===
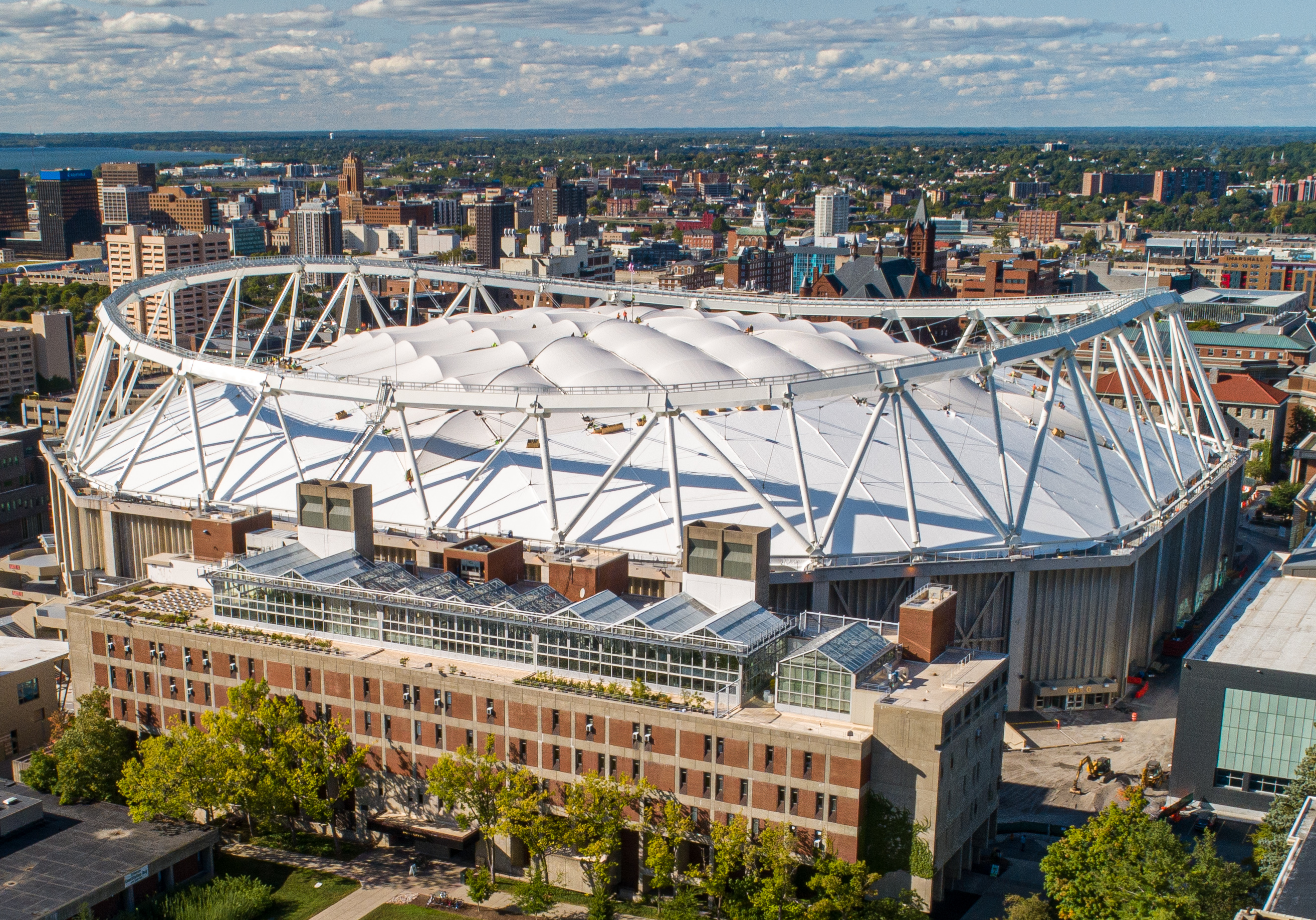
Remodeled JMA Wireless Dome 2021

Built in 1980, the JMA Wireless Dome is a 49,250-seat domed sports stadium located on the campus of Syracuse University. It is both the largest domed stadium on a college campus and the largest domed stadium in the Northeast. It is home to the Syracuse Orange football, basketball, and lacrosse teams. With regard to basketball, it holds another title, being the largest on-campus basketball arena, with a listed capacity of 33,000. This limit has been exceeded several times. The Dome sold an on-campus NCAA record of 35,446 tickets for a game against the Duke Blue Devils on February 1, 2014. The previous record was set on February 23, 2013, against the Georgetown Hoyas, with 35,012 in the stands.

=== Manley Field House ===
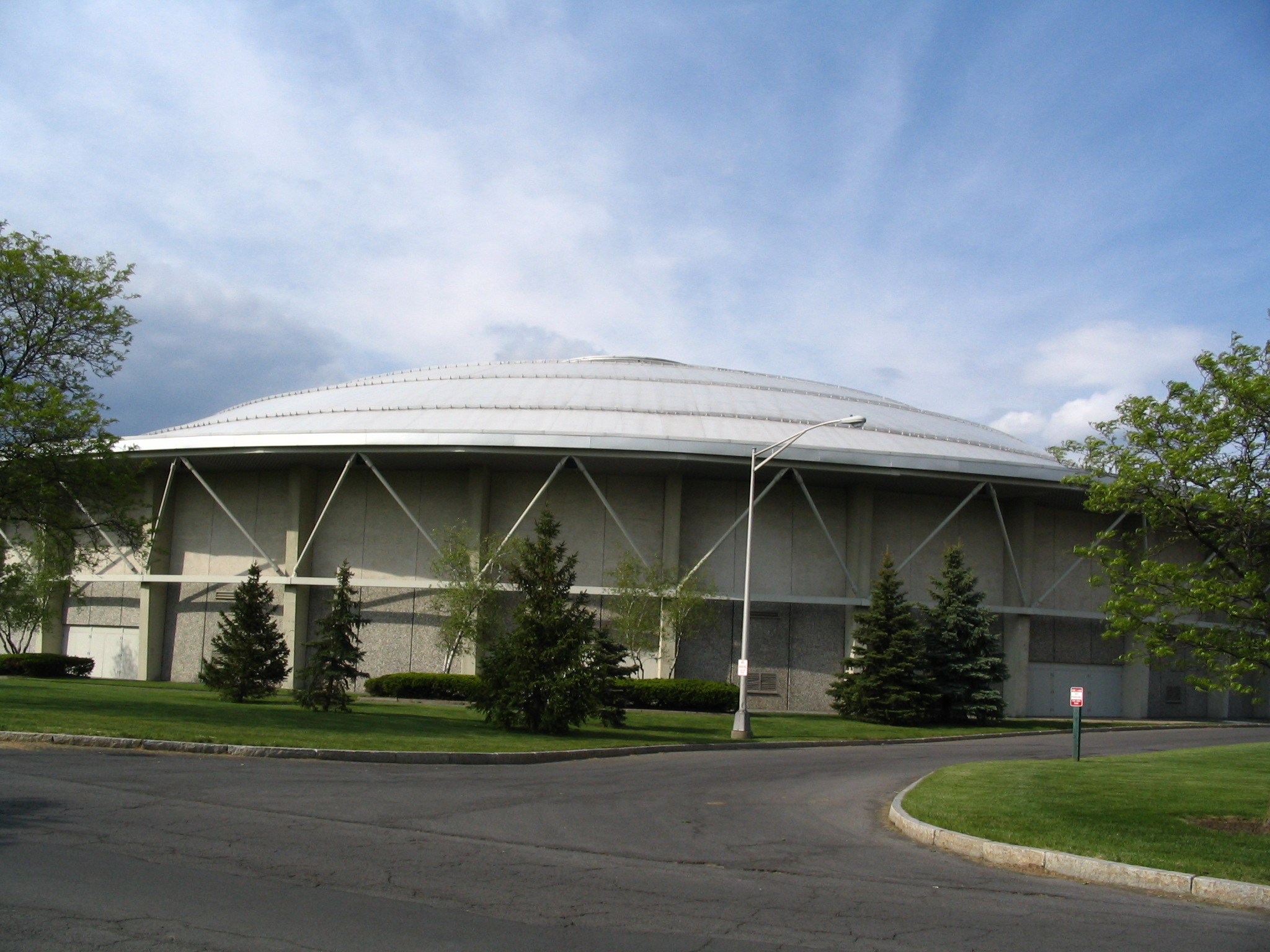
Manley Field House

Built in 1962, this complex houses many of the offices of SU Athletics including the Equipment Room. It also contains academic rooms and two weight rooms strictly for Syracuse athletes only. Adjacent to the complex there are a variety of fields used for softball, soccer, field hockey, as well as a track for the track and field team. Manley was initially used as an indoor training facility for the football team, as well as a home court for men's basketball. Its seating capacity, 9,500, for basketball, at the time among the largest campus facilities in the Northeast, supported the rise to national prominence of the men's basketball program. The team shifted to the JMA Wireless Dome after the 1980 season. In the final men's basketball game played at Manley, Georgetown snapped the Orangemen's 57 game home winning streak.

=== Carmelo Anthony Basketball Center ===
The name comes from Syracuse basketball star, Carmelo Anthony, who donated $3 million to the project. Anthony played one year with the Orange, the 2002–2003 season, in which he helped the program win its only NCAA Championship. It's a college basketball practice facility located in Syracuse, New York. The facility opened September 24, 2009. Both the men's and women's basketball teams for Syracuse University use the center. The facility houses two practice courts, locker rooms and office facilities for the men's and women's basketball programs at Syracuse. It is located on the north side of Manley Field House, in between the Roy Simmons Sr. Coaches Wing and the Comstock Art Facility.

=== Tennity Ice Skating Pavilion ===
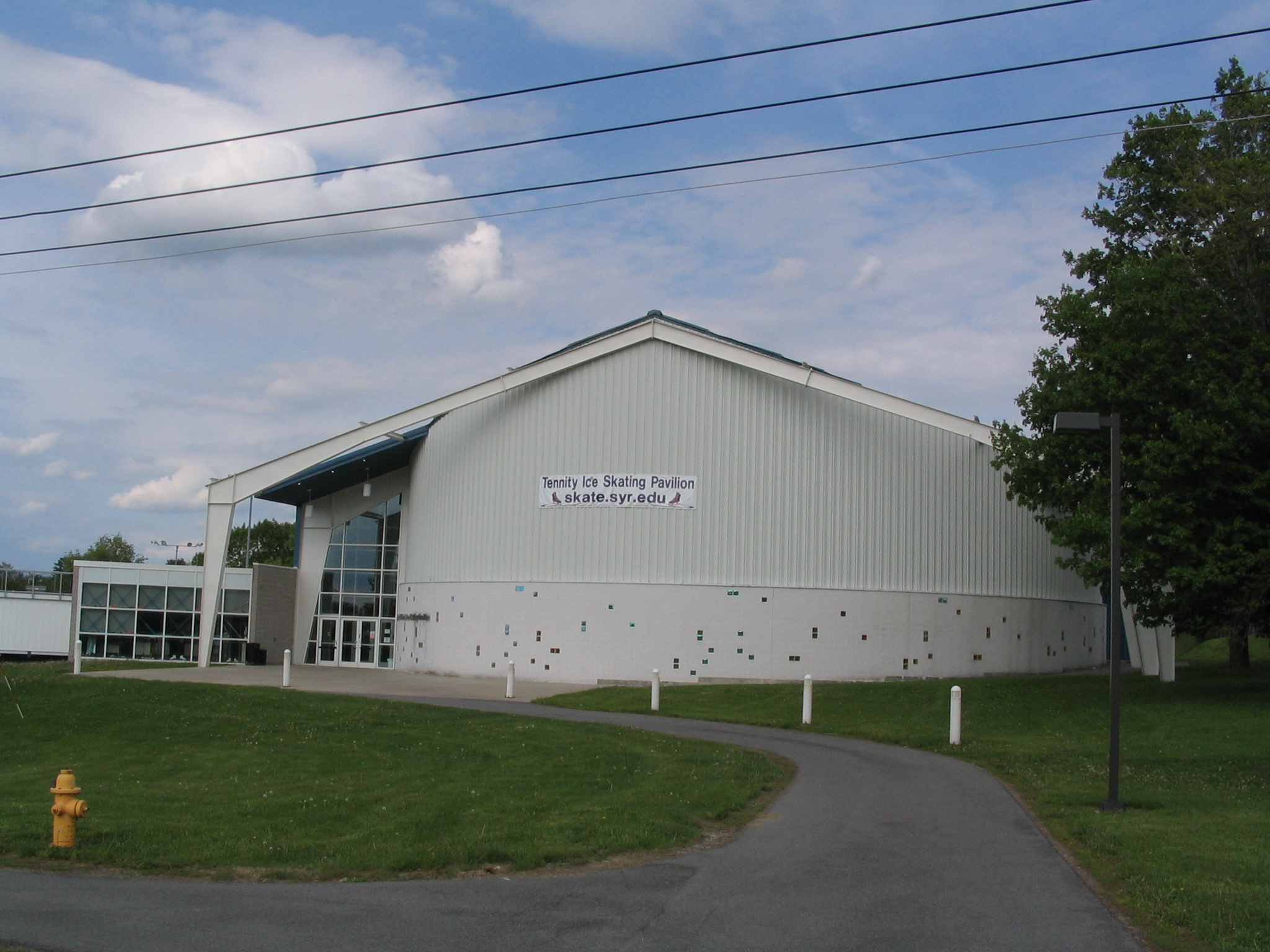
Tennity Ice Skating Pavilion

Home of the NCAA Division I Syracuse University ice hockey programs playing in the College Hockey America conference. Named for donors Marilyn and Bill Tennity, the Pavilion opened in October 2000.

=== Drumlins Country Club ===
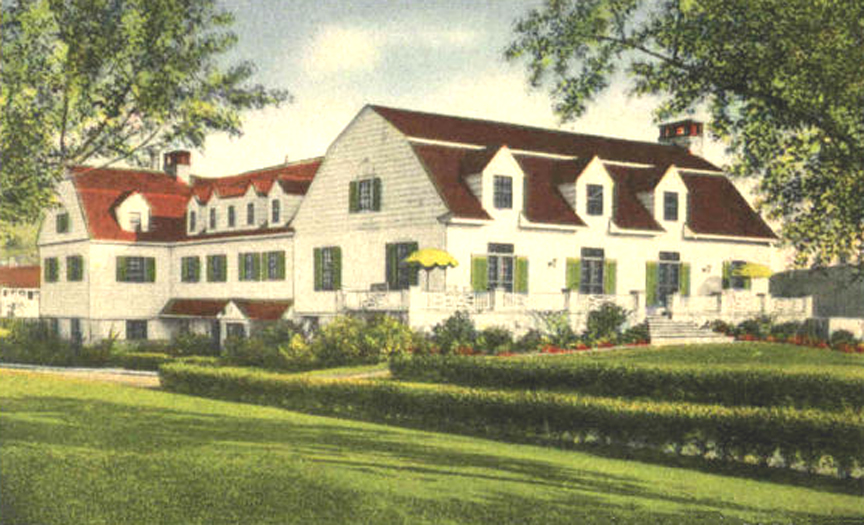
Drumlins Country Club in the 1920s

Owned by Syracuse University, the Drumlins Country Club, 800 Nottingham Road, DeWitt, New York, operates a private, 18-hole golf course; a public, 18-hole golf course; indoor tennis courts; and other facilities. The tennis courts are home of the Syracuse University's women's tennis team.

Founded in 1926 by Roderick Burlingame Sr., Drumlins was purchased in 1969 by Syracuse University. The ice skating rink and bowling alley on premises were closed due to financial reasons. The club's restaurant, Bistro 1926, is located in the farm's original barn.

=== SU Soccer Stadium ===
The SU Soccer Stadium is a 1,500 seat soccer-specific stadium that is home to the Syracuse Orange men's and women's soccer programs. The stadium opened in 1996 and is located behind the Manley Field House. The Hookway Fields Complex is a large practice facility with seven grass practice fields for training. The complex was completed in 2004 and is located near the soccer stadium.

=== Historic ===
==== Archbold Stadium ====
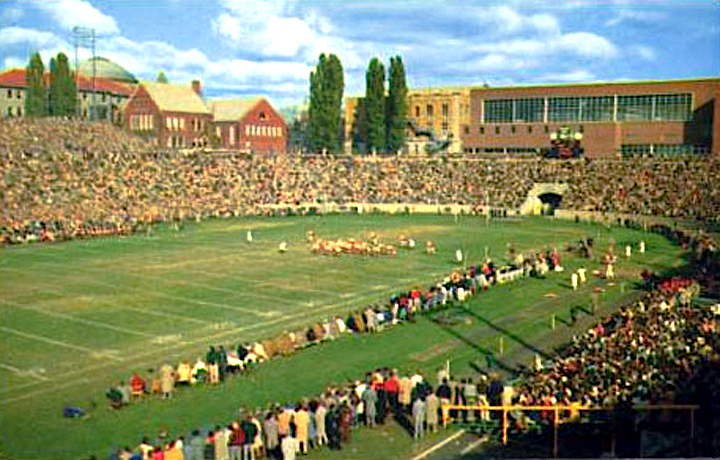
Archbold Stadium

Thanks to a $600,000 gift by Syracuse University trustee and Standard Oil President, John D. Archbold, what was publicized as the "Greatest Athletic Arena in America" opened in 1907. Designed to resemble the Roman Colosseum and to never become outdated, Archbold Stadium became a trademark of Syracuse football. The stadium formed a massive concrete oval, 670 feet (204 m) long and 475 feet (145 m) wide. It was 100 feet (30 m) longer and only 22 feet (7 m) thinner than the JMA Wireless Dome, and more than 6 million Orangemen football fans passed through its gates.

From 1907 until 1978, Archbold Stadium was the home of SU football. Archbold opened up with a bang when the Orange defeated Hobart 28–0. It went out in style 71 years later, with an improbable victory over second-ranked Navy 20–17. Syracuse posted a record of 265–112–50 at Archbold, and it housed many great teams. It was home of the 1915 squad, which was invited to play in the prestigious Rose Bowl and outscored its opponents 331 to 16. The 1959 team also called Archbold home en route to SU's only National Championship.

In 1978, SU fans said good-bye forever to the historic stadium. Archbold was demolished to make way for the new on-campus facility, the JMA Wireless Dome, which opened in 1980.

== Championships ==
=== NCAA team championships ===
Syracuse has won 16 NCAA team national championships.

- Men's (15)
  - Basketball (1): 2003
  - Boxing (1): 1936
  - Cross Country (2): 1951, 2015
  - Lacrosse^{*} (10): 1983, 1988, 1989, 1990 (vacated), 1993, 1995, 2000, 2002, 2004, 2008, 2009
  - Soccer (1): 2022
- Women's (1)
  - Field Hockey (1): 2015
- see also:
  - ACC NCAA team championships
  - List of NCAA schools with the most NCAA Division I championships

=== Other national team championships ===
Below are 17 national team titles that were not bestowed by the NCAA:

- Men's
  - Basketball^{∆} (2): 1918, 1926
  - Cross-country (4): 1919, 1922, 1923, 1925
  - Football (1): 1959
  - Lacrosse (4): 1920^{#}, 1922, 1924, 1925
  - Rowing (6): 1904, 1908, 1913, 1916, 1920, 1978

^{*} After the 1990 championship, the NCAA Committee on Infractions determined that Paul Gait had played in the 1990 championship while ineligible. Under NCAA rules, Syracuse and Paul Gait's records for that championship were vacated. The NCAA does not recognize Syracuse and Coach Roy Simmons Jr.'s 3–0 record, and Paul Gait's 7 goals, 7 assists and his participation in that championship.

^{∆} No title games or contemporary selections made. Retroactive selections by Helms and Premo-Porretta.

^{#} Syracuse and Lehigh claim 1920 title based on winning their USILL divisions. No title game played. Syracuse-Lehigh game won by Lehigh.

- see also:
  - List of NCAA schools with the most Division I national championships

== Notable coaches, past and present ==
- Lew Andreas – Men's Basketball (1924–1950), Football (1922–1929)
- Jim Boeheim – Men's Basketball (1976–2023) Basketball Hall of Fame
- Lew Carr – Baseball (1910–1942) Helms Foundation College Baseball Hall of Fame
- Laurie D. Cox – Men's Lacrosse (1916–1930) National Lacrosse Hall of Fame
- Roy Danforth – Men's Basketball (1968–1976)
- John Desko – Men's Lacrosse (1999–2021) National Lacrosse Hall of Fame
- Gary Gait – Men's Lacrosse (2021–present) National Lacrosse Hall of Fame, National Lacrosse League Hall of Fame
- Ted Kleinhans – Baseball (1947–1966)
- Dick MacPherson – Football (1981–1991) College Football Hall of Fame
- Doug Marrone – Football (2009–2012)
- Frank "Buck" O'Neill – Football (1906–07, 1913–15, and 1917–19) College Football Hall of Fame
- Paul Pasqualoni – Football (1991–2004)
- Ben Schwartzwalder – Football (1949–1973) College Football Hall of Fame
- Roy Simmons Sr. – Men's Lacrosse (1931–1969) National Lacrosse Hall of Fame
- Roy Simmons Jr. – Men's Lacrosse (1970–1998) National Lacrosse Hall of Fame
- Edwin Sweetland – Men's Football (1900–1902), Rowing (1901–1902)
- James A. Ten Eyck – Rowing (1903–1938)

== Notable athletes ==
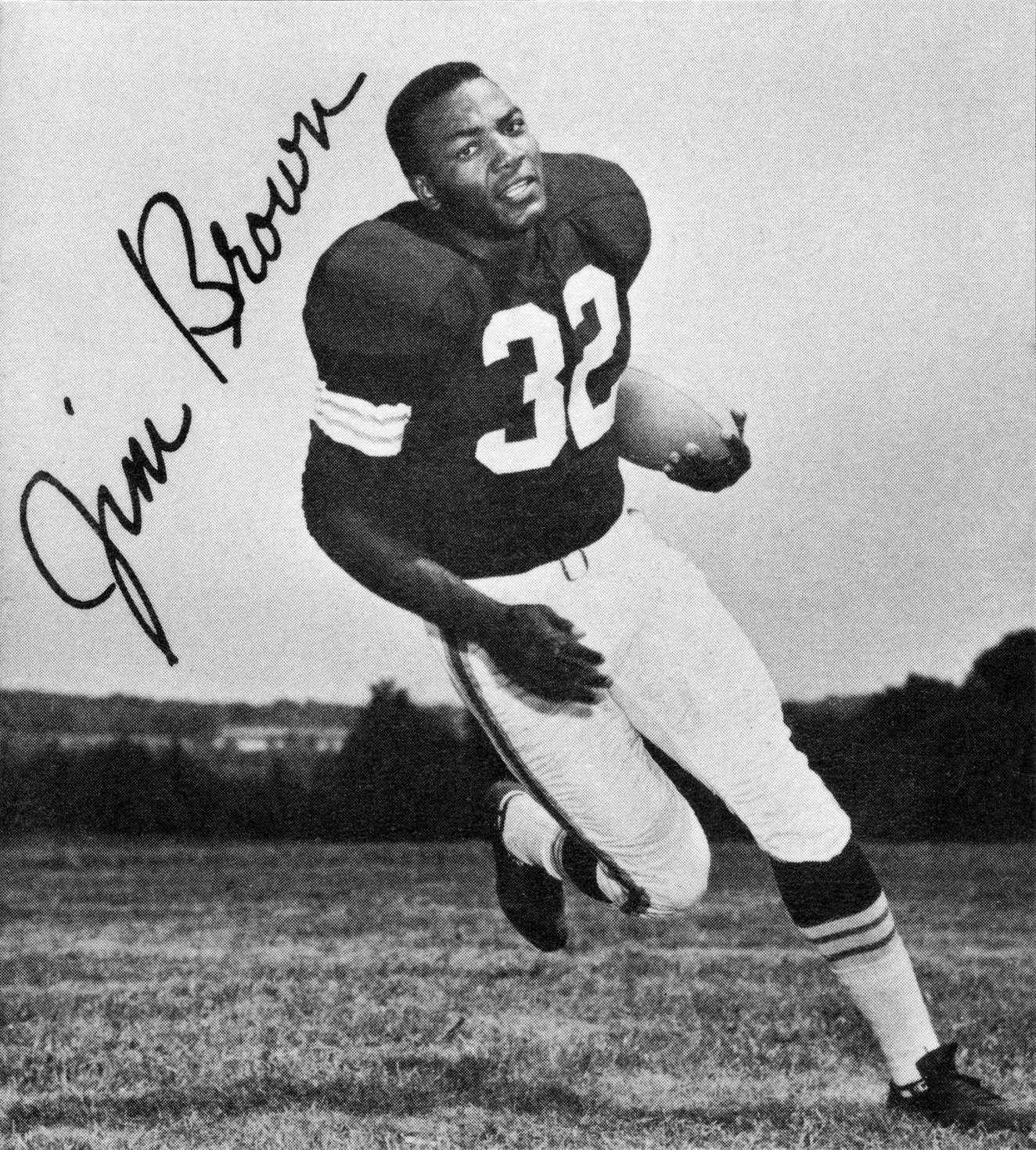
Jim Brown

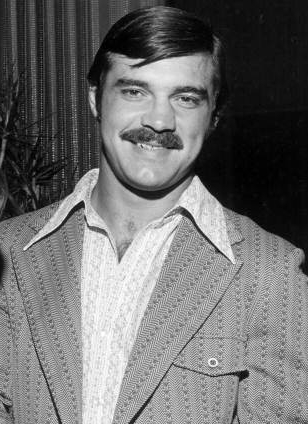
Larry Csonka

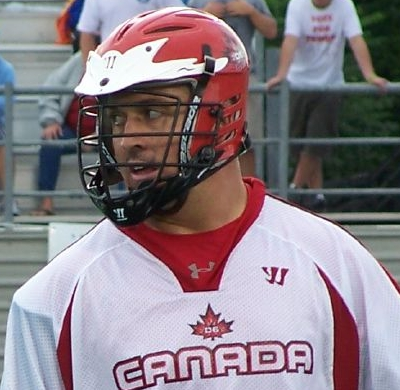
Gary Gait

- Doc Alexander (1916–1920) – College Football Hall of Fame, 2-time All American, 2-time NFL All-Pro selection
- Gary Anderson (1978–1981) – All American kicker, second all-time in NFL scoring, 2-time NFL All-Pro selection
- Carmelo Anthony (2002–2003) – NCAA basketball tournament Most Outstanding Player, Olympic Gold Medalist, most points scored in Olympic play
- John Barsha (born Abraham Barshofsky; 1898–1976), professional football player
- Dave Bing (1963–1966) – Basketball Hall of Fame, Mayor of Detroit
- Oshae Brissett (2017–2019) – basketball player in the Israeli Basketball Premier League, and formerly with the Indiana Pacers, Boston Celtics, and Philadelphia 76ers in the NBA; NBA champion
- Jim Brown (1954–1957) – College Football Hall of Fame, National Lacrosse Hall of Fame, Pro Football Hall of Fame
- Keith Bulluck (1996–1999) – 3-time NFL All-Pro selection linebacker
- Michael Carter-Williams (2011–2013) – NBA Rookie of the Year
- Derrick Coleman (1986–1990) – Silver Anniversary Big East Basketball Team, All-time Big East rebounding leader, NBA Rookie of the Year
- Tom Coughlin (1964–1967) – Head Coach, New York Giants
- Larry Csonka (1965–1967) – College Football Hall of Fame, Pro Football Hall of Fame
- Ernie Davis (1959–1961) – Heisman Trophy winner, College Football Hall of Fame
- Sherman Douglas (1986–1989) – Two-time basketball All American, All-time Big East assists leader, NBA Star
- Dennis DuVal (1970–1974) – Former NBA player and All-American basketball player
- Jonny Flynn (2007–2009) – Minnesota Timberwolves 2009 First Round selection, 2009 Big East tournament MVP
- Dwight Freeney (1998–2001) – 6-time NFL Pro Bowl selection, 3-time NFL All-Pro selection, Super Bowl Champion, Indianapolis Colts all-time sacks leader
- Gary Gait (1986–1989) – 2-time National Player of the Year, 2-time McLaughlin Award (Midfielder of the Year) winner, Lacrosse Hall of Fame, National Lacrosse League Hall of Fame
- Paul Gait (1986–1989) – National Lacrosse Hall of Fame, National Lacrosse League Hall of Fame
- Dave Giusti (1959–1961) – Major League Baseball All Star, Sporting News Reliever of the Year
- Marty Glickman (1936–1939) – Football All American, Olympic sprinter
- Marvin Graves (1990–1993) – All-time school passing yards leader
- Donté Greene (2007–2008) – Brooklyn Nets, player
- Tim Green (1982–1985) – College Football Hall of Fame
- Vic Hanson (1924–1927) – Basketball Hall of Fame, College Football Hall of Fame
- Marvin Harrison (1992–1995) – All American, Six-time All Pro wide receiver
- Jason Hart (1997–2000) – All Big East First Team
- Wesley Johnson (2008–2010) – First Team All American, Big East Player of the Year, Naismith Award Finalist, Los Angeles Lakers, player
- Daryl Johnston (1985–1988) – Two-time All Pro fullback
- Mark Kerr – 1992 All-American and NCAA Division I 190 lbs champion wrestler, two-time UFC tournament champion
- Jim Konstanty (1937–1939) – 1950 National League MVP, Saves leader
- Brad Kotz (1982–1985) – National Lacrosse Hall of Fame
- Floyd Little (1964–1966) – College Football Hall of Fame, Pro Football Hall of Fame
- Ron Luciano (1957–1960) – lineman, played professionally for the Detroit Lions, and Major League Baseball umpire
- John Mackey (1960–1962) – Pro Football Hall of Fame
- Julie McBride (2000–2004) – All-time Syracuse women's basketball scoring and assist leader
- Donovan McNabb (1995–1998) – Big East Offensive Player of the Decade (football)
- Gerry McNamara (2002–2006) – Two-time All Big East Basketball Team and NCAA National Champion
- Don McPherson (1985–1988) – Heisman Trophy runner-up, Maxwell Award winner (College Football Player of the Year), College Football Hall of Fame
- Dave Meggyesy (1959–1963) – NFL linebacker for seven seasons; author of Out of Their League in 1970; retired NFLPA Western Regional Director
- Gene Mills (1977–1981) – Four-time NCAA Wrestling All-American, two-time NCAA champion and 1981 Outstanding Wrestler, 1980 U.S. Olympian, 1980 World Cup champion and Outstanding Wrestler, National Wrestling Hall of Fame, Greater Syracuse Sports Hall of Fame
- Century Milstead (1922) – Heavyweight wrestler on Syracuse's first team, NFL and AFL player, College Football Hall of Fame (1977)
- Art Monk (1976–1979) – All American wide receiver, 3-time All Pro, Pro Football Hall of Fame
- Joe Morris (1978–1981) – All-time Syracuse rushing leader, 2-time Pro Bowl selection
- Lawrence Moten (1991–1995) – 3-time All Big East Basketball Team, All-time Big East scoring leader
- Jim Nance 1962–1965 All America wrestling, AFL All star
- Demetris Nichols (2003–2007) – Unanimous selection to All Big East Basketball Team
- Billy Owens (1988–1991) – Big East Men's Basketball Player of the Year, All American, NBA star
- Casey Powell (1995–1998) – 4-time All American, 2-time National Player of the Year (1997, 1998), Jack Turnbull Award (Attackmen of the Year) winner (1998), McLaughlin Award (Midfielder of the Year) winner (1996)
- Mikey Powell (2001–2004) – 4-time All American, 2-time Tewaaraton Trophy winner (2002, 2004), National Player of the Year (2004), 4-time Jack Turnbull Award (Attackmen of the Year) winner
- Ryan Powell (1997–2000) – 4-time All American, National Player of the Year (2000), Jack Turnbull Award (Attackmen of the Year) winner (2000)
- Leo Rautins (1980–1983)
- Andy Rautins (2005–2010) – Big East Second Team All American, Honorable All American Mention, Team Canada Basketball Player, 2nd All-Time in 3-point Field Goals Made in SU Basketball History, New York Knicks, player
- Jim Ringo (1950–1952) – Pro Football Hall of Fame
- Tom Ryan (1989) - All-American Wrestler and Head Wrestling Coach of Ohio State University
- Danny Schayes (1978–1981) – Academic All American, 18-season NBA star
- Rony Seikaly (1984–1988) – All American, Gold Medalist 1986 Basketball World Championships, NBA star, first ever draft pick of the Miami Heat
- Wilmeth Sidat-Singh (1935–1939) – Football and Basketball star, Pioneer of civil rights in college athletics
- Preston Shumpert (1998–2002) – Two-time All-Big East First Team selection
- Walt Sweeney (1960–1962) – 9-time Pro Bowl selection, 2-time First Team All-Pro, 4-time Second Team All-Pro
- Etan Thomas (1997–2000) – Twice Big East Defensive Player of the Year, Washington Wizards player
- David Tyree (1998–2002) – NFL Pro Bowl selection, Super Bowl Champion
- Hakim Warrick (2001–2005) – Big East Men's Basketball Player of the Year, Phoenix Suns player
- Dwayne "Pearl" Washington (1983–1986) – Silver Anniversary Big East Basketball Team

== Nicknames, mascots and colors ==
Orange is the official school color, adopted as such in 1890. Prior to that time, the school's colors were rose pink and pea green. In 1898, a proposition to add secondary blue color was vehemently opposed by students and alumni. Orange, blue, and white are traditionally used for athletic uniforms. According to an 1890 newspaper article uncovered by the Syracuse Post Standard, the orange was originally a reference to the Netherlands, which first colonized New York State. It's common in upstate New York for place names to make reference to the Dutch heritage. In a similar way, the original settlement that became Albany was called Fort Orange.

The athletic nickname derives from the official color. Prior to 2004, the official nicknames of the athletic teams were the "Orangemen" and "Orangewomen." These former nicknames are still affectionately used by some fans. However, beginning with the 2004–2005 school year, the official nickname was changed to the "Orange." This revision is gender-neutral, concise, and reflects the basis of the nickname as being the school color.

Other nicknames over the years have included the "Hilltoppers," for the school's location on a hill, and the "Saltine Warriors," for a former mascot.

=== Mascot ===
==== The Saltine Warrior ====
In 1931, a Native American warrior known as Nathan March aka: "Saltine Warrior" became the athletic mascot. The name derived from an article describing an archaeological dig on campus allegedly uncovering the artifacts of a Native American warrior. The warrior was called the "Saltine Warrior" because of the abundant salt deposits in the Syracuse, New York area. The article was later revealed to be a hoax, but the mascot remained for next four decades.

In the mid-1950s, the father of a Lambda Chi Alpha fraternity brother owned a cheerleading camp. He made a Saltine Warrior costume for his son to wear at Syracuse football games. Thus began a nearly forty-year tradition of Lambda Chi brothers serving as the university's mascot.

In 1978, the Saltine Warrior was banned by the university as part of the national movement to eliminate Native American motifs, becoming one of the first colleges to do so. The mascot briefly morphed into a Roman warrior, but was eventually replaced unofficially in 1982 by a giant, cartoon-style Orange.

==== Otto the Orange ====
The cheerleaders and mascots were at a UCA Cheerleading Camp in Tennessee that summer, and narrowed the field down to two potential names—"Opie" and "Otto." Figuring the name "Opie" would lead to the inevitable rhyme with "dopey," they settled on "Otto." Later that fall, word got out that the cheerleaders were calling the latest mascot costume Otto, and the name stuck.

Otto the Orange was adopted by the university in 1995 as the university's official mascot, selected over a wolf and a lion also under consideration.
