= Space burial =

Launching of cremated human remains into space

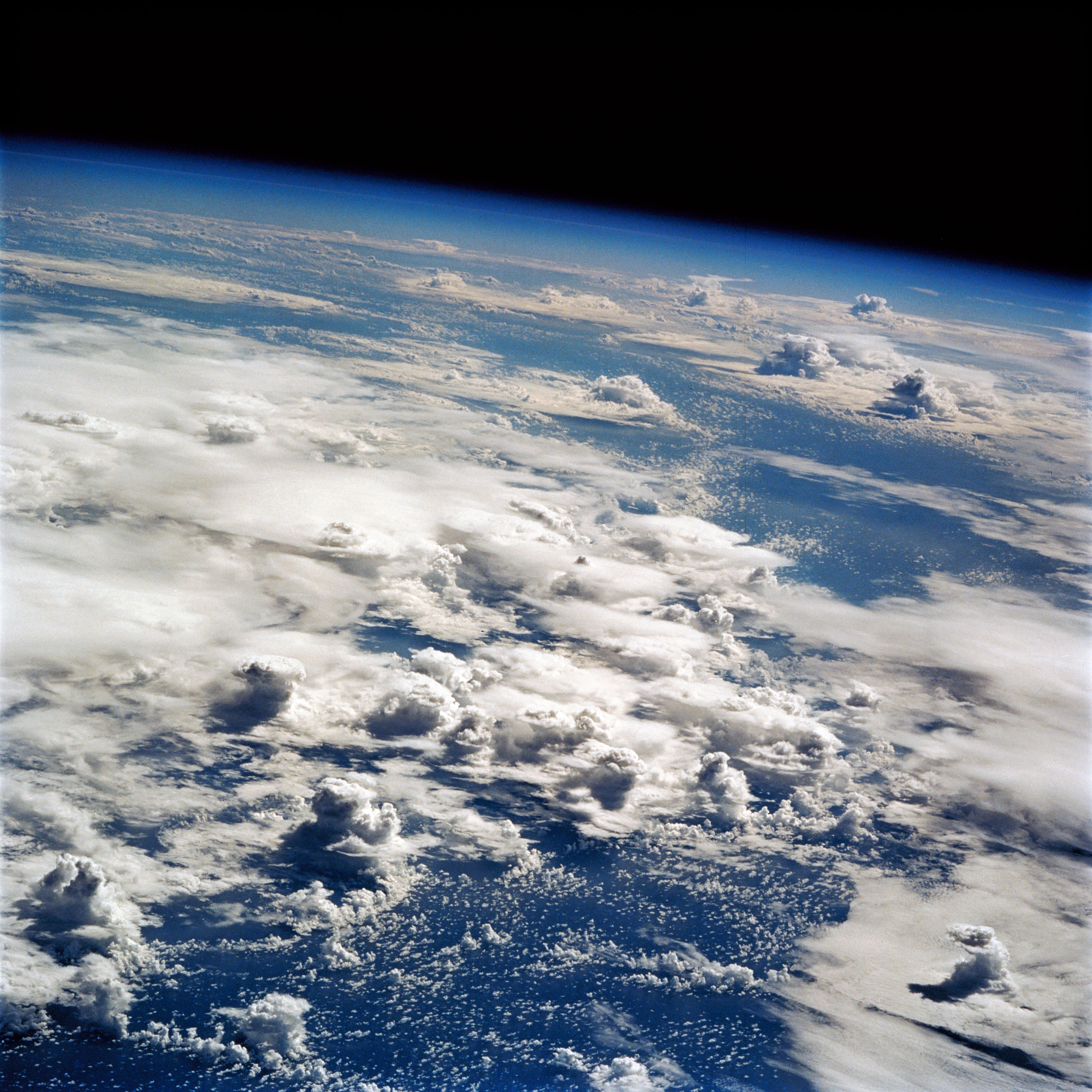
Space burials launch cremated remains out of the atmosphere.

Space burial is the launching of human remains into space. Missions may go into orbit around the Earth or to extraterrestrial bodies such as the Moon, or farther into space.

Remains are sealed until the spacecraft burns up upon re-entry into the Earth's atmosphere or they reach their extraterrestrial destinations. Suborbital flights briefly transport them into space then return to Earth where they can be recovered. Small samples of remains are usually launched to minimize the cost of launching mass into space, thereby making such services more affordable.

== History and typology ==
The concept of launching human remains into space using conventional rockets was proposed by the science fiction author Neil R. Jones in the novella "The Jameson Satellite", which was published in the pulp magazine Amazing Stories in 1931. It was later proposed as a commercial service in the 1965 movie, The Loved One, and by Richard DeGroot in a Seattle Times newspaper article on April 3, 1977. Since 1997, the private company Celestis has conducted numerous space burials flying as secondary payloads.

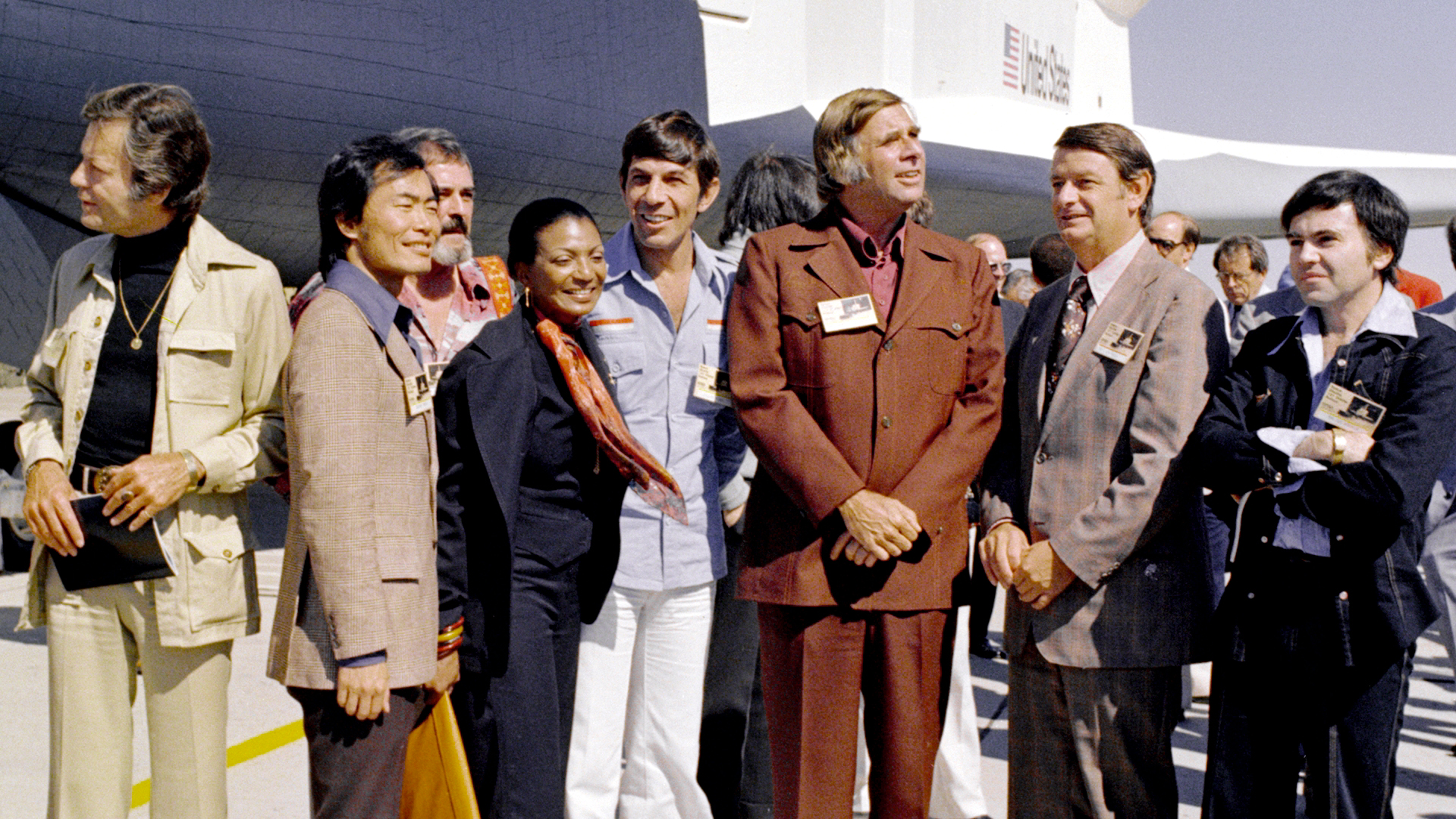
Gene Roddenberry (third from the right) in 1976 with most of the cast of Star Trek at the rollout of the Space Shuttle Enterprise at the Rockwell International plant at Palmdale, California, US

=== Maiden flights ===
The first space burial occurred in 1992 when the NASA Space Shuttle Columbia (mission STS-52) carried a sample of Gene Roddenberry's cremated remains into space and returned them to Earth.

The first private space burial, Celestis' Earthview 01: The Founders Flight, was launched on April 21, 1997. An aircraft departing from the Canary Islands carried a Pegasus rocket containing samples of the remains of 24 people to an altitude of 11 km (6.8 mi) above the Atlantic Ocean. The rocket then carried the remains into an elliptical orbit with an apogee of 578 km (359 mi) and a perigee of 551 km (342 mi), orbiting the Earth once every 96 minutes until re-entry on May 20, 2002, northeast of Australia. Famous people on this flight included Roddenberry and Timothy Leary.

=== Suborbital flights ===
Short flights that cross the boundary of space without attempting to reach orbital velocity are a cost-effective method of space burial. The remains do not burn up and are either recovered or lost.

=== Moon burial ===
The first Moon burial was that of Eugene Merle Shoemaker, a portion of whose cremated remains were flown to the Moon by NASA. Shoemaker's former colleague Carolyn Porco, a University of Arizona professor, proposed and produced the tribute of having Shoemaker's ashes launched aboard the NASA's Lunar Prospector spacecraft. Ten days after Shoemaker's passing, Porco had the go-ahead from NASA administrators and delivered the ashes to the Lunar Prospector Mission Director Scott Hubbard at the NASA Ames Research Center. The ashes were accompanied by a piece of brass foil inscribed with an image of Comet Hale–Bopp, an image of a Meteor Crater in northern Arizona, and a passage from William Shakespeare's Romeo and Juliet. The Lunar Prospector spacecraft was launched on January 6, 1998, and impacted the south polar region of the Moon on July 31, 1999.

Missions to the Moon are proposed by both Elysium Space and Celestis as part of a mission by Astrobotic Technology of Pittsburgh. The first mission in January 2024 failed to reach the Moon due to a failure of the spacecraft and instead reentered Earth's atmosphere shortly after.

=== Pet burial ===
In 2014, Celestis launched Celestis Pets, a pet memorial spaceflight service for animal cremated remains. Prior to then, Bismarck, a Monroe, Washington police dog may have flown on a 2012 memorial spaceflight. When this news broke, Celestis' president said that if dog ashes were on the rocket, the person who supplied the cremated remains likely violated the contract they signed with Celestis.

=== Dedicated spacecraft ===
On May 17, 2017, Elysium Space announced the world's first memorial flight involving a dedicated spacecraft. The CubeSat was placed as a secondary payload on a SpaceX Falcon 9 rocket as part of a dedicated rideshare mission called SSO-A planned by Spaceflight. The launch took place from Vandenberg Air Force Base in California on December 3, 2018. The launch was successful, however, industry sources have noted that the Elysium Star spacecraft remained attached to the deployer due to a failure to procure proper licensing.

== Space burial businesses ==
Space burial businesses generally refer to their service offering as "Memorial Spaceflight".

Business name	Date established	Operating status	Destinations offered
Celestis	1994	Active	Launch to space and return to Earth, into Earth orbit, to lunar surface, into deep space
Elysium Space	2013	Inactive	Launch into Earth orbit, to lunar surface
Space NTK	2017	Active	Launch into Earth orbit, to lunar surface
Beyond Burials	2020	Active	Launch into Earth orbit, to lunar surface
Space Beyond	2025	Active	Launch into Earth orbit

== Spaceflight history ==
=== Orbital ===
Launch date	Mission provider	Launch vehicle	Destination	Remains samples	Results
2020~
July 7, 2026	Space NTK	Falcon 9	Earth orbit	8 remains samples	Success
March 15, 2025	Beyond Burials	Falcon 9	Earth orbit	Remains samples	Success
December 21, 2024	Space NTK	Falcon 9	Earth orbit	Remains samples	Success
March 4, 2024	Beyond Burials	Falcon 9	Earth orbit	Remains samples	Success
January 3, 2023	Beyond Burials	Falcon 9	Earth orbit	Remains samples	Success
May 15, 2022	Celestis	Falcon 9	Earth orbit	Remains samples	Success
April 1, 2022	Space NTK	Falcon 9	Earth orbit	Remains samples	Success
2010-2019
2018	Elysium Space	Falcon 9	Earth orbit	Remains samples	Planned
November 3, 2015	Elysium Space	SPARK	Earth orbit	Remains samples	Failure
December 5, 2014	NASA	Delta IV Heavy	Earth orbit	Remains sample of NASA Orion engineer	Success
May 22, 2012	Celestis	Falcon 9	Earth orbit	Over 300 remains samples	Success
2000-2009
August 2, 2008	Celestis	Falcon 1	Earth orbit	Over 200 remains samples	Failure
September 21, 2001	Celestis	Taurus rocket	Earth orbit	43 remains samples	Failure
1990-1999
December 20, 1999	Celestis	Taurus rocket	Earth orbit	36 remains samples	Success
February 10, 1998	Celestis	Taurus rocket	Earth orbit	30 remains samples	Success
April 21, 1997	Celestis	Pegasus rocket	Earth orbit	24 remains samples	Success
October 22, 1992	NASA	Space Shuttle Columbia	Earth orbit	Remains sample of Gene Roddenberry	Success

=== Moon ===
Launch Date	Mission Provider	Launch Vehicle	Destination	Remains samples	Results
2010~
2018	Elysium Space	Falcon 9	Lunar surface	Remain samples	Planned
Not available	Celestis	Details not available	Lunar surface	Remain samples	Planned
1990-1999
January 6, 1998	NASA	Athena II/Lunar Prospector	Lunar surface	Remains sample of Eugene Shoemaker	Success

=== Deep space ===
Launch Date	Mission Provider	Launch Vehicle	Destination	Remains samples	Results
2000~2009
January 19, 2006	NASA	Atlas V/New Horizons	Deep space	Remains sample of Clyde Tombaugh	Success

=== Suborbital ===
Launch Date	Mission Provider	Launch Vehicle	Remains samples	Results
2010~
October 23, 2014	Celestis	SpaceLoft XL	24 remains samples	Success
June 21, 2013	Celestis	SpaceLoft XL	31 remains samples	Success
May 20, 2011	Celestis	SpaceLoft XL	Over 8 remains samples	Success
May 4, 2010	Celestis	SpaceLoft XL	Over 19 remains samples	Success
2000-2009
May 2, 2009	Celestis	SpaceLoft XL	16 remains samples	Failure
April 28, 2007	Celestis	SpaceLoft XL	Over 200 remains samples	Success
September 29, 2004	Scaled Composites	SpaceShipOne	Remains sample of the mother of SpaceShipOne's designer, Burt Rutan.	Success

== Notable individuals buried in space ==
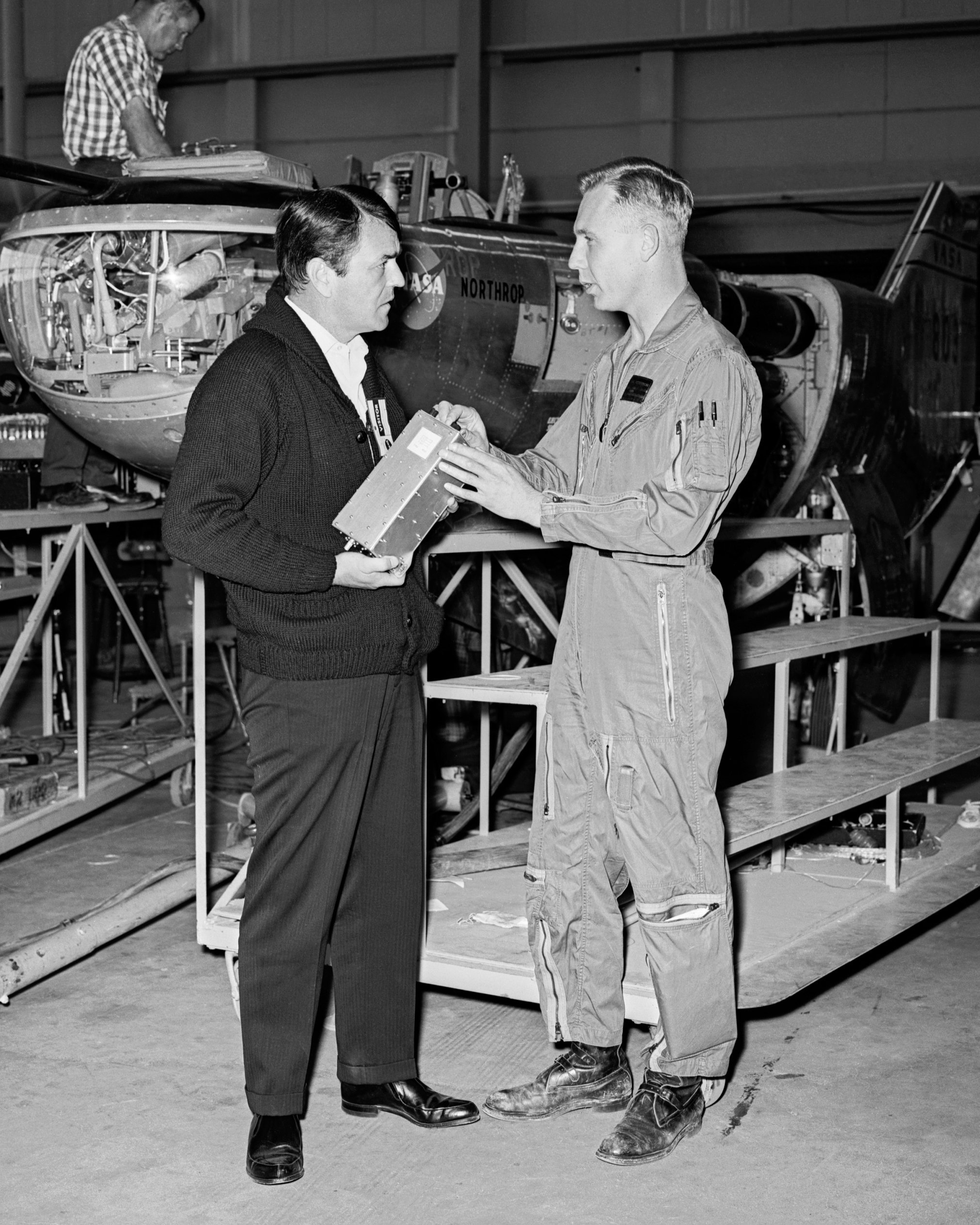
James Doohan (left) visiting NASA's Dryden Flight Research Center with pilot Bruce Peterson April 13, 1967 in front of the Northrop M2-F2

=== Launched into Earth orbit ===
- Gene Roddenberry (1921–1991), creator of Star Trek.
- Gerard K. O'Neill (1927–1992), space physicist.
- Krafft Ehricke (1917–1984), rocket scientist.
- Timothy Leary (1920–1996), American writer, psychologist, psychedelic drug advocate and Harvard University professor.

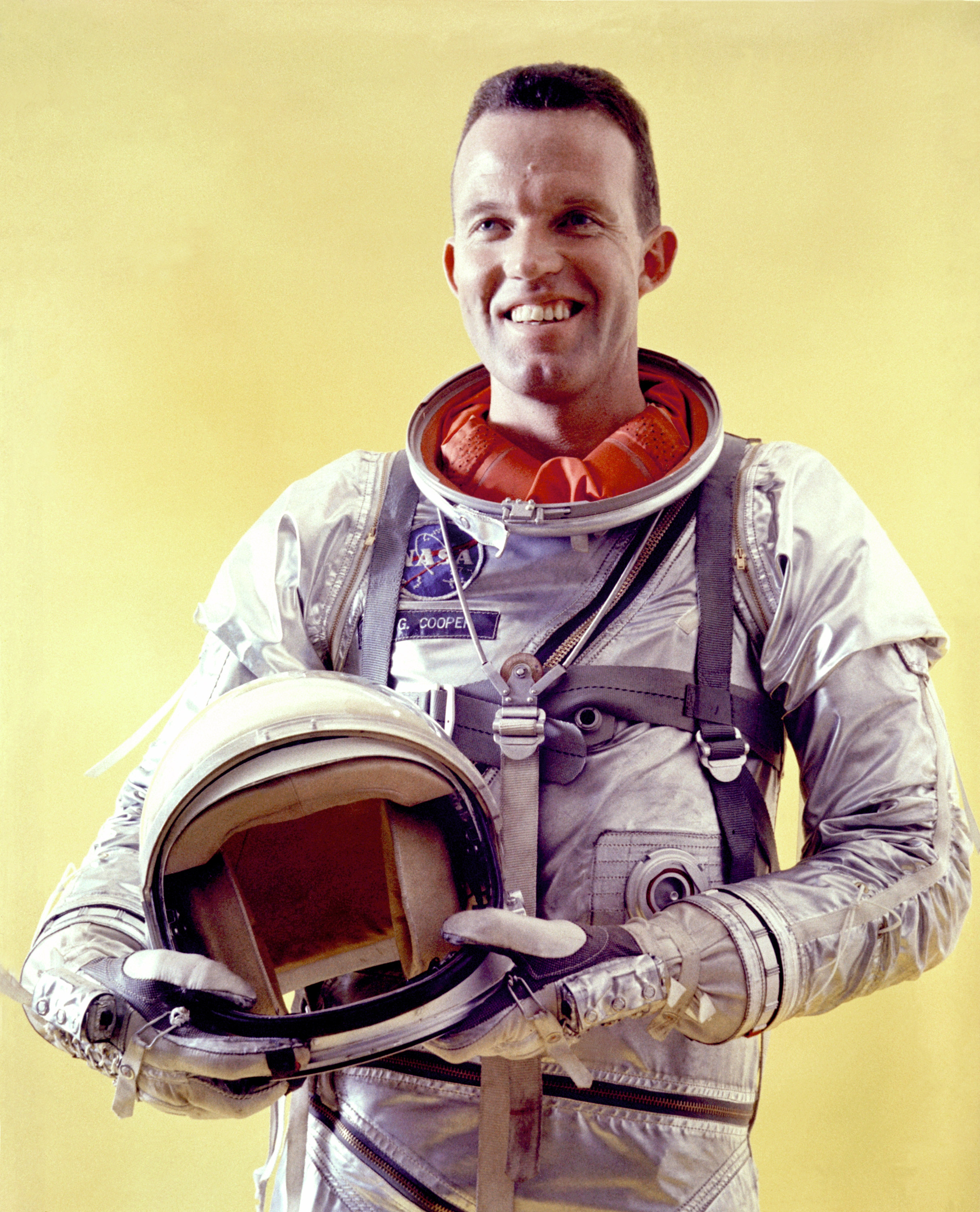
L. Gordon Cooper

- James Doohan (1920– 2005), actor best known for his portrayal of Scotty in the television and film series Star Trek. Celestis also launched him into space in 2007 and in 2008.
- Leroy Gordon "Gordo" Cooper Jr. (1927–2004), American astronaut. He was one of the original Mercury Seven pilots in the Project Mercury program, the first crewed space effort by the United States.

=== Launched into outer space ===
- Nichelle Nichols (1932–2022), American actress best known for her role as Nyota Uhura in the original Star Trek was launched on the maiden flight of the Vulcan Centaur.
- Eugene Merle Shoemaker (1928–1997), astronomer and co-discoverer of Comet Shoemaker–Levy 9.
- Clyde Tombaugh (1906–1997), American astronomer and discoverer of Pluto in 1930. A small sample of Tombaugh's ashes are aboard New Horizons, the first spacecraft to pass by and photograph Pluto. This is the first sample of human cremated remains which will escape the Solar System.

=== Planned space burials ===
- Leiji Matsumoto (1938–2023), Japanese creator of numerous anime and manga series including Galaxy Express 999, Space Battleship Yamato and Space Pirate Captain Harlock, announced his intention to have a symbolic portion of his cremated remains to be launched into space on a future Elysium Space mission.

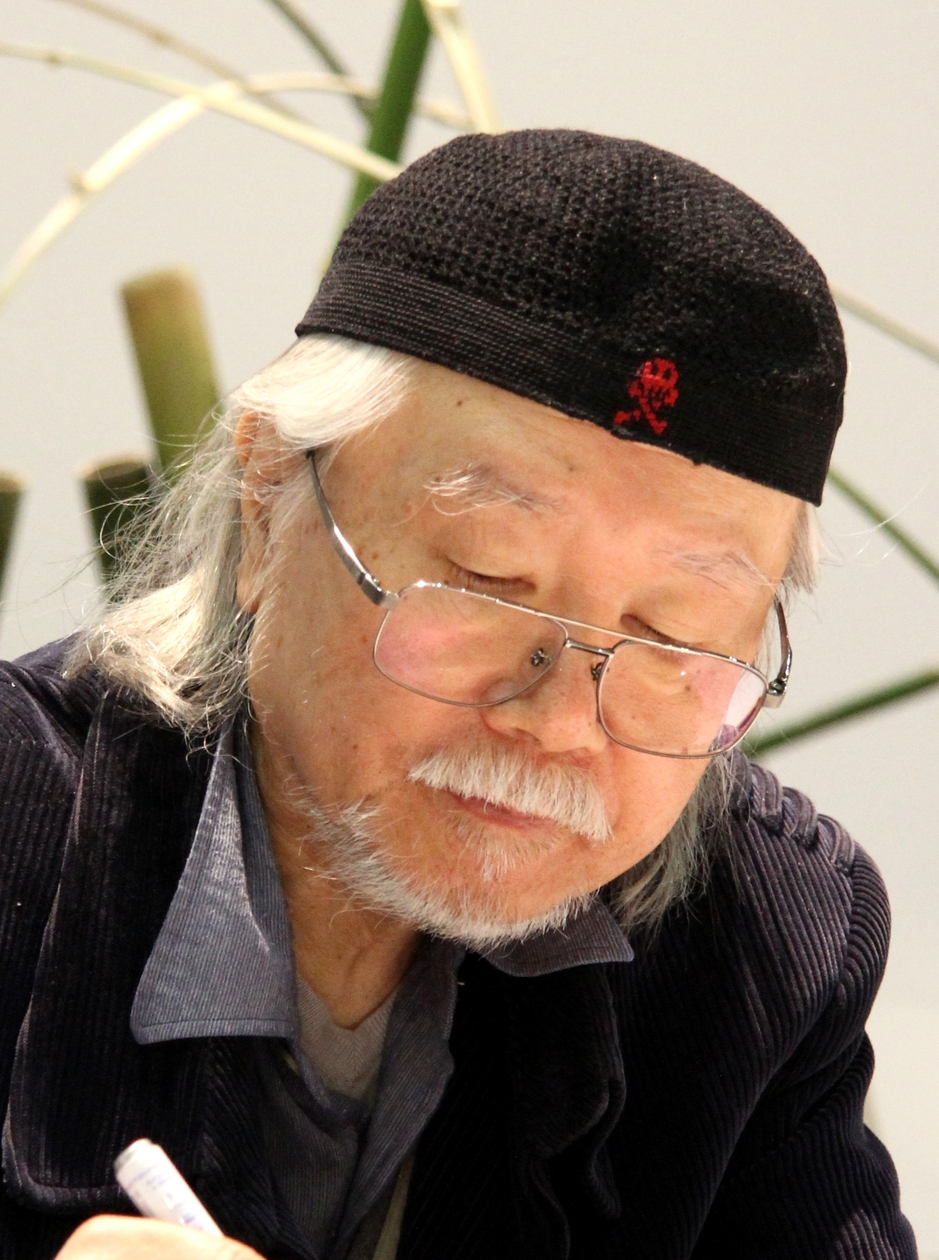
Leiji Matsumoto at a book signing event in 2014

- Majel Barrett (1932–2008), American actress who played Christine Chapel in the original Star Trek series; wife of Gene Roddenberry. A symbolic portion of both her cremated remains and Roddenberry's cremated remains will be launched into space on a future Celestis mission.
- William R. Pogue (1930–2014), American astronaut.
- Luise Clayborn Kaish (1925–2013), American sculptor and painter.
