= Space NTK =

Japanese space burial company

- Company type: Private
- Industry: Space burial
- Founded: December 2017 in Tsukuba, Japan
- Founder: Tomoko Kasai
- Fate: Active
- Headquarters: Nerima, Tokyo, Japan
- Website: www.space-ntk.com

Space NTK is a space funeral company providing space burial services for the cremated remains of both human and pets. The company also conducts space pre-funeral by sending part of one's body such as nails and hair to space. Space NTK was founded by Tomoko Kasai in 2017.

== Flights ==
The company's first satellite, Magokoro was launched on 1 April 2022 as part of SpaceX's Transporter-4 mission. As of May 2022, Space NTK's second satellite was planned to be launched in January 2023. The company's first space pre-funeral is scheduled to be launched in 2025. In an interview from 2021, Kasai stated that in the future it may become possible for one to perform cremation scattering on the Moon or Mars.

=== Magokoro ===
Magokoro (Japanese for sincerity) is Space NTK's first space burial mission and carries the cremated remains of ten humans and pets. The ashes are kept inside aluminum cylinders, which in turn are placed inside a metal box. There are three boxes in total, one of which contains the cremated remains. Another box carries 200 paper cranes, and the third box carries 3000 message cards and tanzaku. The satellite was built by Kato Seisakujyo, a metal processing company in Sumida, Tokyo.

In 2020 the company contracted SpaceX to send Magokoro to orbit. One factor that led to SpaceX's selection was that the rocket upper stages launched by SpaceX are being monitored continuously until they reenter Earth's atmosphere. By attaching Magokoro to the upper stage, the risk of it becoming space debris can be avoided. Originally scheduled to be launched in December 2021, Magokoro was launched to space on 1 April 2022. According to Space NTK, Magokoro will reenter Earth's atmosphere five to six years after launch and burn up as shooting stars.

== See also ==
- Celestis
- Elysium Space
