= Temple B'rith Kodesh (Rochester, New York) =

Reform synagogue in New York, US

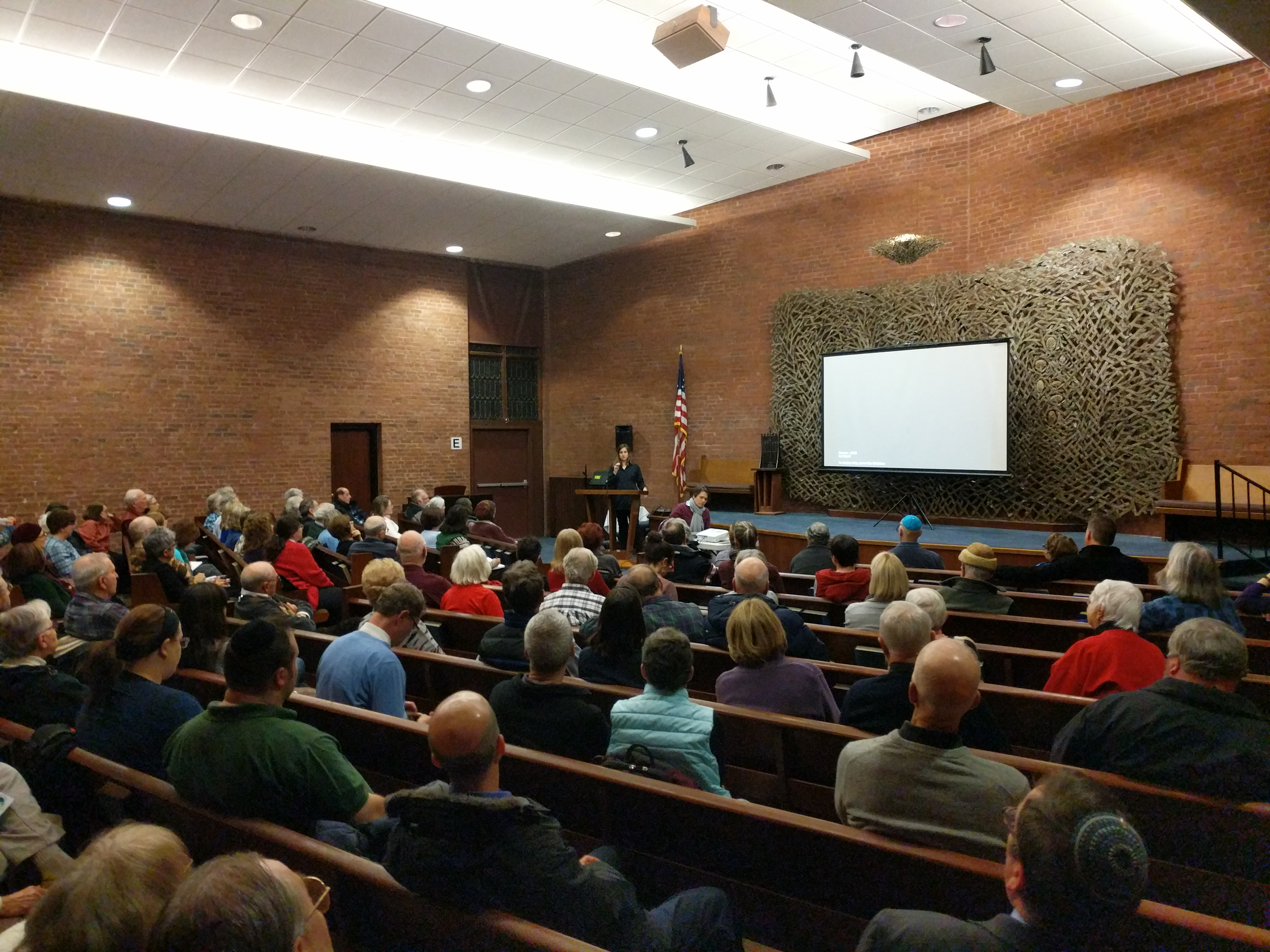
- The synagogue interior in 2019

- Location in New York Temple B'rith Kodesh (Rochester, New York) (the United States)

Religion
- Affiliation: Reform Judaism
- Ecclesiastical or organisational status: Synagogue
- Leadership: Rabbi Peter W. Stein; Rabbi Rochelle Tulik (Associate)
- Status: Active
- Notable artworks: Salvador Dalí-designed menorah

Location
- Location: 2131 Elmwood Avenue, Brighton, Rochester, Monroe County, New York 14618
- Country: United States
- Coordinates: 43°7′28″N 77°34′46″W

Architecture
- Architect: Pietro Belluschi
- Type: Synagogue
- Established: 1848 (as a congregation)
- Completed: 1962

Website
- tbk.org

Temple B'rith Kodesh is a Reform Jewish synagogue located at 2131 Elmwood Avenue, in the suburb of Brighton, in Rochester, Monroe County, New York, in the United States. It is the oldest synagogue and the largest Reform congregation in the greater Rochester area.

== History ==
Temple B'rith Kodesh was founded in 1848 as an Orthodox congregation with 12 members. By 1894 the congregation had grown to over 250 members and a building was purchased in downtown Rochester. During this period, a gradual change from Orthodoxy to Classical Reform began.

On Simchat Torah in 1962 a new building in the suburb of Brighton was dedicated.

Felix A. Levy was rabbi of the Temple from 1907 to 1908.

== Synagogue building ==
The Temple's current building was designed by architect Pietro Belluschi. The sanctuary is roofed with a domed wooden drum intended to evoke the wooden synagogues of Poland. Sculptor Luise Kaish was commissioned to create the Temple's ark, which Samuel Gruber calls “one of the major works of the last half century . . . even today the presence of Kaish’s figures on the ark is an exciting shock” in American Synagogues: A Century of Architecture and Jewish Community.

In 2001, the Temple was gifted one of the largest private holdings of menorahs in the world, inclusive of work by Salvador Dalí.
