= Otto the Orange =

Mascot for Syracuse University athletic teams

- Logo version of Otto the Orange
- University: Syracuse University
- Conference: ACC
- Description: "Anthropomorphic citrus with arms, legs and lots of energy"
- First seen: 1980

Otto the Orange is the mascot for the Syracuse Orange, the athletic teams of Syracuse University in Syracuse, New York, USA. Otto is an anthropomorphism of the color orange, wearing a large blue hat and blue pants. Otto can often be seen at Syracuse sporting events in the JMA Wireless Dome, at other venues and regularly across the university's campus.

== Mascot history ==
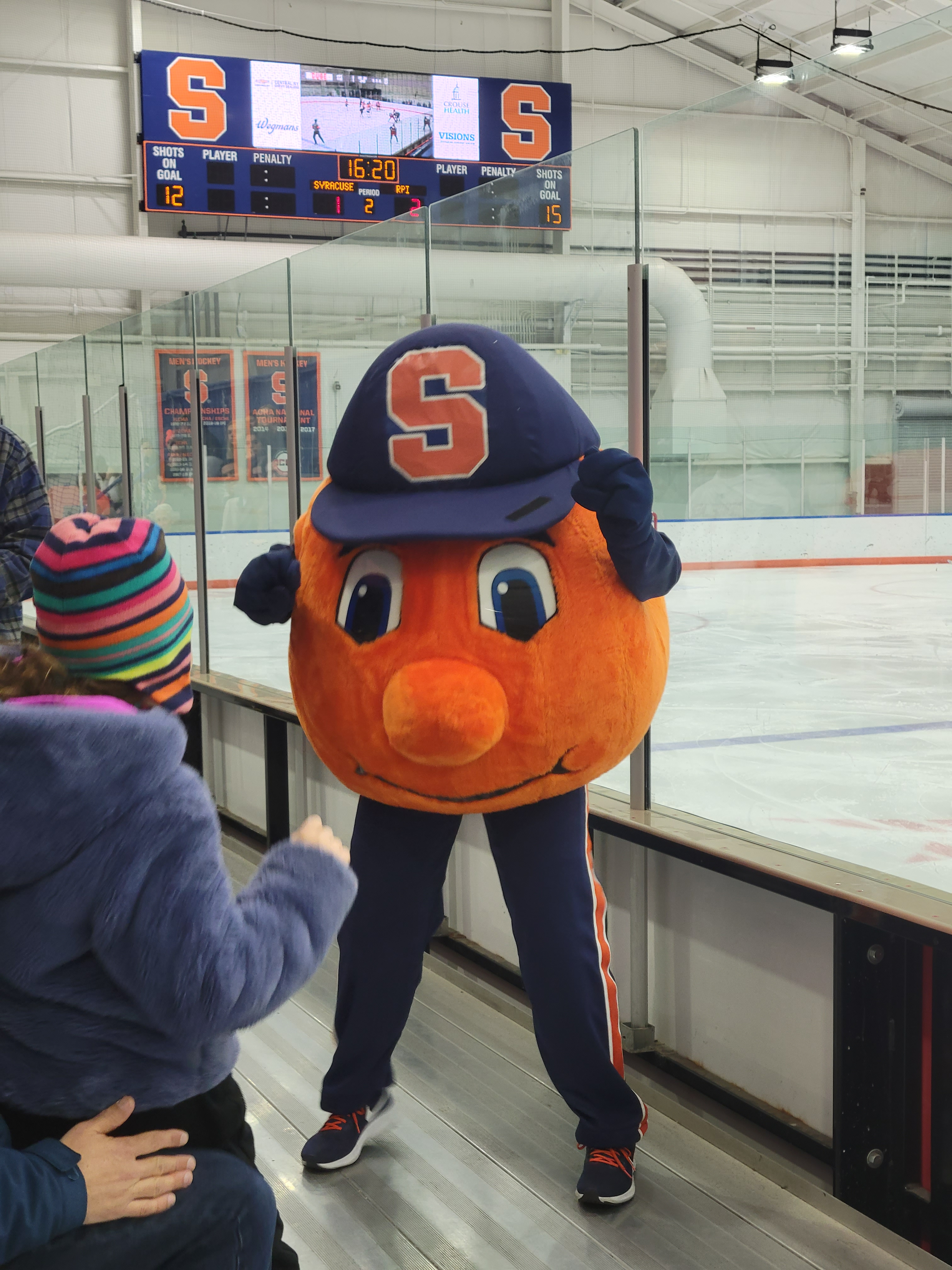
Otto the Orange entertains the audience at Syracuse Orange women's ice hockey game at the Tennity Ice Skating Pavilion (2023).

A 1997 article in the Syracuse University Magazine provides a short history of the mascots at Syracuse University. One of the earliest mascots, recorded in 1894, was a dog with a football helmet.

=== Saltine Warrior ===
The Syracuse mascot was originally a Native American character named "The Saltine Warrior" (Syracuse's unofficial nickname is the Salt City) and "Big Chief Bill Orange". The character was born out of a hoax from a report by student humor magazine Orange Peel, in which it was claimed that a 16th-century Onondaga chief was unearthed while digging the foundation for the women's gymnasium in 1928.

In the mid-1950s, the father of a Lambda Chi Alpha fraternity brother owned a cheer leading camp. He made a Saltine Warrior costume for his son to wear at SU football games. Thus began a nearly forty-year tradition of Lambda Chi brothers serving as SU's mascot. In 1990 however the University opened up the mascot traditions to the entire student body (Daily Orange, February 22, 1990).

In December 1977, Native American students successfully petitioned the University to discontinue the Saltine Warrior, citing the mascot's stereotypical portrayal of Native Americans. The mascot was discontinued in 1978. Oren Lyons, Onondaga Nation leader and an alumn, called the warrior derogatory. During the 1978 season, the University introduced a Roman gladiator dressed in orange armor, but the idea proved largely unpopular among fans, who regularly booed the mascot.

=== Otto becomes official ===
In the 1980s, a new Syracuse University mascot emerged and was described by Sports Illustrated in 1984 as a "juiced-up, bumbling citrus fruit from which two legs protrude", and quickly became popular on campus. Then, the mascot was simply known as "the Orange", and was designed and crafted by Eric Heath, an SU cheerleader, according to the SU Archives.

Early on the mascot had multiple monikers, including Clyde and Woody. In the summer of 1990, the cheerleaders and mascots were at Cheerleading Camp in Tennessee and the students who were chosen to suit up in the costume narrowed the field down to two potential names — "Opie" and "Otto" — as a new orange costume was made. It was concluded that the name "Opie" would lead to the inevitable rhyme with 'dopey', and settled on "Otto." Later that fall, word got out that the cheerleaders were calling the latest mascot costume Otto, and the name stuck.

For 17 years the university did not settle on an "official" mascot until the chancellor appointed a group of students and faculty to create a mascot and logo. University administration considered introducing a new mascot – a wolf ("An Orange Pack of Wolves") or lion were likely candidates – but the student body supported Otto. The Orange was recognized as the official mascot of Syracuse University in December 1995 by Chancellor Buzz Shaw.

Another logo of Otto the Orange

In 2016, Otto was named in the top-10 mascots in college football by Sports Illustrated. In the same year, Otto was ranked No. 1 mascot in the ACC by ESPN.

On 12 August 2023, Otto was inducted in the Mascot Hall of Fame following a two-week online vote in May.

In January 2024, the National Bobblehead Hall of Fame and Museum unveiled an Otto Bobblehead to celebrate the National Bobblehead Day on January 7. The museum previously released two versions of Otto bobblehead in 2017. One celebrated the 2003 basketball National championship while the other showed Otto with a lacrosse stick to honor 11 national championships of the Syracuse Orange men's lacrosse team.

=== Mascot team ===
There are a team of about 5-14 performers that dress as Otto; this team contains a mix of personalities and genders. As of 2023, over 100 Syracuse students have taken on the role of Otto, and 2023-24 featured an all-women cast for the first time in Syracuse history. Similar body builds are required so not one Otto stands out; performers need to be in the desired height range of 5 feet and 5 inches, to 5 feet and 10 inches. The orange costume weighs about 10 pounds, and stunts, dances, gestures and general movement are all practiced and routinized. The Ottos take turns attending events. Otto will never be in two places at once, preserving the magic of the mascot; if there are two sporting events happening at the same time, Otto's appearances will be split between the two events. In the 2022-23 school year, Otto appeared at over 800 on-campus and off-campus events – an increase of 100 than in 2019.

== Social media ==
Otto maintains an active presence across multiple social media platforms, primarily sharing content related to Syracuse University athletics, campus events, and community engagement. The mascot's social media accounts feature a mix of promotional content, behind-the-scenes footage, and interactions with fans and other university mascots.

Otto uses they/them pronouns, and following Instagram's introduction of the pronouns feature in May 2021, Otto's official Instagram account has listed pronouns as "they/them" in the bio section.

The Mascot Hall of Fame describes Otto's online persona as energetic and enthusiastic, friendly and approachable, and mischievous and curious.

Otto has leveraged social media presence for broader media appearances, including multiple This is SportsCenter commercials for ESPN.
