= The Saltine Warrior =

Former mascot of Syracuse University in the United States

The Saltine Warrior was the former mascot of Syracuse University in New York, United States. It was in use for the college from 1931 to 1978. Based on a legend about Ogeekeda Hoschenegada, a 16th-century leader of the Onondaga Nation, the mascot acquired popularity after appearing in school publications and eventually became part of the university's culture. At first, the mascot was celebrated across campus, symbolizing pride and spirit. The Saltine Warrior became a rallying symbol which was prominently seen at sporting events and other highly publicized gatherings. However, everything changed in the middle of the 1950s, when the mascot would start to receive high levels of controversy. Students and indigenous communities objected to a caricature costume, to which was worn by members of Syracuse's Lambda Chi Alpha fraternity. The mascot was retired in 1978 as a result of efforts to have it removed, and this marked the beginning of programs designed to increase indigenous inclusion and knowledge on campus.

== History ==
The development of the Saltine Warrior as Syracuse University's mascot became intertwined with the legend of Ogeekeda Hoschenegada, a notable 16th-century chief of the Onondaga Nation. The supposed finding of Ogeekeda Hoschenegada's remains was the central story point. Excavation partner Dr. Burges Johnson made waves when he announced the discovery of what was allegedly an image or likeness of the chief. Named "O-gee-ke-da Ho-schen-e-ga-da," which translates to "The Salt (or Salty) Warrior" in English, this representation was made. Throughout the university community and beyond, this revelation sparked curiosity and fascination.

The excavation of the former Syracuse University Women's Building in the late 1920s marked the beginning of this blending of academic culture and historical myth. The academic community was intrigued and fascinated by the widespread belief that Ogeekeda Hoschenegada's remains had been discovered during this dig. Not only was the supposed finding of Hoschenegada's remains intriguing historically, but it soon became a central story at Syracuse University. Even though subsequent information proved the story was untrue, it had a significant and long-lasting effect on the university's culture.

It was published in The Orange Peel in 1931, which provided a forum for the myth's propagation, bringing it to the forefront and igniting interest among college students, sparking extensive attention and discussion. The Daily Orange and other regional news outlets later played a part in spreading the myth and ensuring its perpetuation in Syracuse University students' collective memory. The mascot was retired in response to complaints from a Native American student organization regarding its derogatory representation, even though its existence continued until the late 1970s. The university then looked into a number of mascot alternatives before deciding on Otto the Orange in 1980.

A bronze sculpture portraying the Saltine Warrior sits outside of Carnegie Library, a building on the university's North Campus. Graduate student Luise Meyers Kaish created the sculpture in 1951, and presented it as a gift from the class of 1951. It was abandoned as the sports team mascot in 1978, and the statue was moved in front of the Carnegie Library.

== Controversy ==
The portrayal of the Saltine Warrior received significant controversy in the mid-1950s due to its stereotypes and mimicking of Native Americans. During this period, a member of Syracuse University's Lambda Chi Alpha fraternity began attending football games dressed as an exact replica of the Saltine Warrior. This portrayal includes exaggerated and insulting parts intended to be amusing, but ultimately reinforced negative stereotypes about Native American customs. In 1951, a wooden statue portraying a Native American was used by the football team to scratch tally marks on the figure after defeating a team. During some of the school's football games, a drunk white frat student would “take off into the stands and run around making the "whooping" sounds attributed to Indians and their war dances. He would go through a mock form of native Indian dancing. It was clear that the person doing it didn't know or have any respect for the art form at all,” according to Chancellor Melvin Eggers, the ninth chancellor of Syracuse University.

In 1970, the Onondaga Nation Council of Chiefs met with the Chancellor of the university to have the mascot removed on the basis that it was an offensive reuse of their cultural symbols. After a year of negotiations, the Chancellor agreed to change the mascot.

== Conclusion ==
A myth of the discovery of Native American remains during an excavation has caused a chain reaction of controversy in Syracuse and all involved communities. It has led to protests, harm, and disgrace to native cultures, especially against the Onandagan community. After years of chaos, the university officially retired the name and tried to support Native Americans throughout the process.

The early removal of the culturally inappropriate mascots of Syracuse and other universities has been receiving national attention for years. With more major universities and professional sports teams evolving their mascots, a path is paved for other teams, schools, and other organizations to do the same.
