= Elysium Space =

Space burial business

Elysium Space is a space burial company. Burial options the company offers are Earth-orbit and then reentry burnup, and delivery to the lunar surface. The company was the first to offer burial on the Moon.

== History ==
Elysium Space was founded by Thomas Civeit in 2013.

In 2015, a launch aboard a USAF Super Strypi rocket failed to reach orbit. The remains will be reflown in the second launch. The remains were to have orbited for 2 years before reentering and going out in a blaze.

It will offer a service to launch the ashes of dead people into space aboard a SpaceX Falcon 9 rocket that will launch from Vandenberg Air Force Base in California, United States. This rocket rideshare will launch ashes into a Sun-synchronous orbit about the Earth. The Earth orbiting ashes will eventually have its orbit decay and return to Earth as a shooting star.

== Memorial spacecraft ==
Elysium Space launches the cremated remains aboard their Elysium Star space mausoleum satellites, a series of 1U cubesats. The Earth-orbiting satellites are designed to remain in space for 2 years before orbital decay brings them back to Earth as a shooting star, burning up in a blazing reentry.

Elysium Space plans to use Astrobotic's Peregrine lunar lander for their lunar mausoleums.

Elysium Space is in the early stages of planning for deep-space burials.

== Missions ==
Mission	Payload	Date	COSPAR ID	Launcher	Destination	Result	Notes
ORS-4	Elysium Star I 1U CubeSat	2015	n/a	Super Strypi	Sun-synchronous orbit (SSO); Reentry shooting star	Failure	Orbit to have decayed in 2 years. Mission failed to reach orbit.
SSO-A	Elysium Star II; 1U CubeSat	2018	2018-099C	Falcon 9	SSO; Shooting star	On Orbit	Orbit was to decay in 2 years, but satellite was locked into the Lower Free-Flyer dispenser due to license timing issues.

- Lunar missions are yet to be scheduled
- Extrasolar missions are yet to be scheduled

== See also ==
- Celestis, another space burial company
