= Morton Kaish =

American artist (1927–2025)

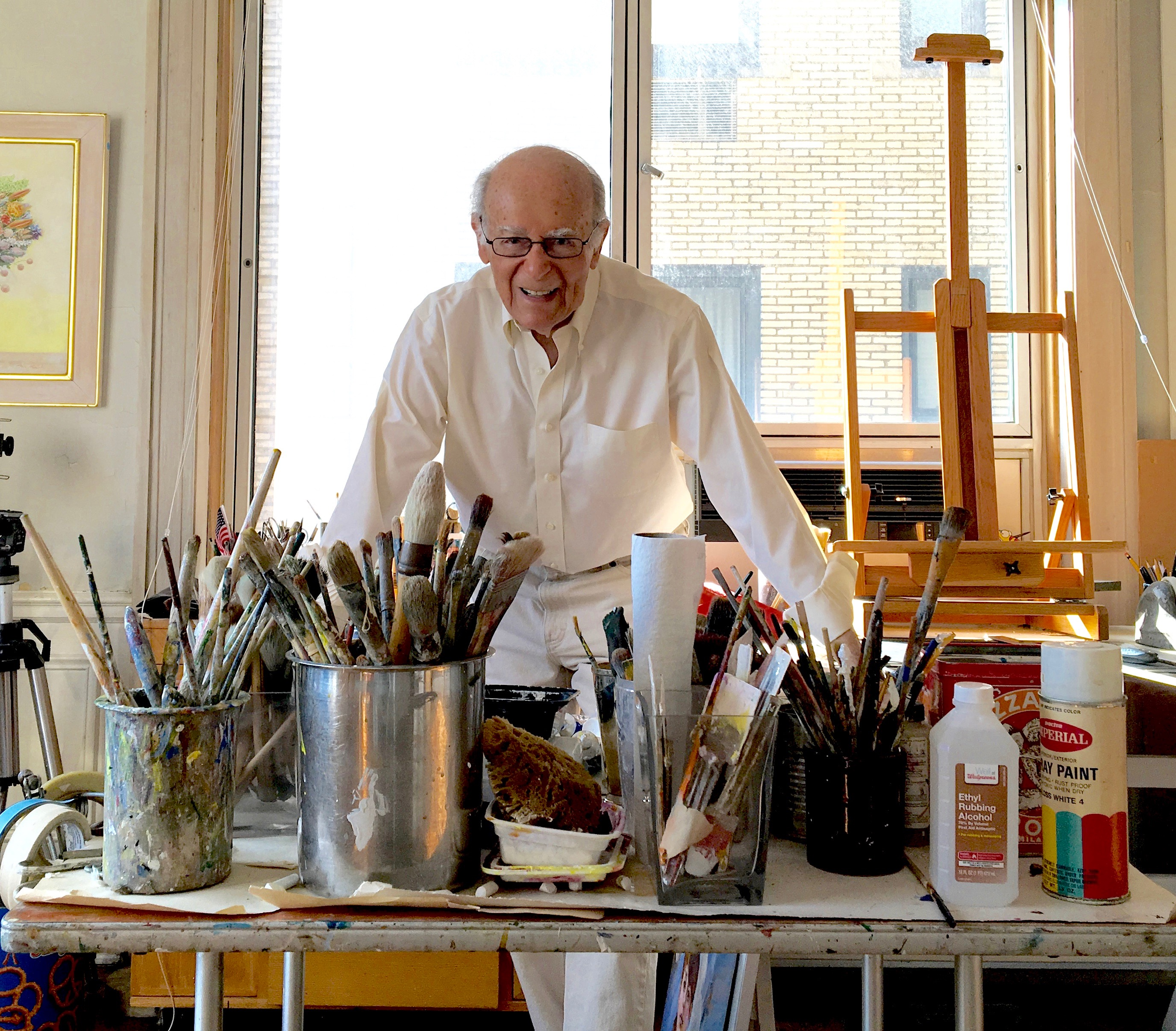
- Morton Kaish in his studio
- Born: January 8, 1927; Newark, New Jersey, U.S.
- Died: October 16, 2025 (aged 98); New York, U.S.
- Education: Syracuse University
- Spouse: Luise Kaish (married 1948)
- Website: mortonkaish.com

Morton Kaish (January 8, 1927 – October 16, 2025) was an American artist whose work integrates the abstract and the figurative. Kaish's paintings and prints have been exhibited by and included in the collections of major national and international museums: the Smithsonian American Art Museum, the Metropolitan Museum of Art and the British Museum, among others. In addition to his accomplishments as an artist, Kaish had a successful career as a fashion illustrator.

== Background ==
His father immigrated from Romania to the U.S. and served in World War I, where he fought and was wounded in the Meuse–Argonne offensive before marrying and starting a family.

Kaish was born on January 8, 1927, in Newark, New Jersey, and grew up in Maplewood, New Jersey. He attended Columbia High School. Kaish had an early affinity for drawing and painting, which was fostered by weekend trips to the Metropolitan Museum in New York City. He accelerated his high school studies, graduating at the age of 16 in order to attend Syracuse University's College of Fine Arts. Syracuse's College of Fine Arts had developed a national reputation after becoming the first university fine arts program to grant degrees in the United States.

During Kaish's years at Syracuse, the College of Fine Arts underwent radical change. Midway through Kaish's course of study, the university's president, William Tolley, swept out the current art faculty—artists steeped in Realism who taught traditional techniques—and hired Norman Rice, former head of the Art Institute of Chicago, who ushered in an emphasis on Abstraction and contemporary approaches to art. Kaish was deeply influenced by these changes, as were classmates including Sol LeWitt.

When Kaish turned 18, he enlisted in the U.S. Maritime Service and put his studies on hold in order to serve in World War II. His first post was as base artist at the Sheepshead Bay Maritime Training Center, where Kaish painted officers' portraits. One of his works was on view and won an award at the annual art exhibition by Merchant Seamen of the United Nations, held in December 1945. After being moved to a new post, Kaish received an officer's commission and served on missions to Europe on the S.S. Laconia Victory and the S.S. Helen Hunt Jackson.

Upon returning from service, he married artist Luise Kaish in 1948 and completed his BFA degree in 1950. The couple lived briefly in Rochester, New York, before traveling extensively throughout Europe during the 1950s. During these years, Kaish worked and studied at the Académie de la Grande Chaumière in Paris, the Istituto statale d'arte, Florence, and the Accademia di Belle Arti, Rome.

In the early 1960s, Kaish returned to the U.S. and settled in New York City's Greenwich Village. Living in a MacDougal Street loft above the Cafe Reinzi—hailed as a center for Village intellectual life—Kaish pursued his art. Shortly after the birth of his daughter, Melissa Kaish Dorfman, the Kaishes relocated to the Upper West Side studios where they worked side-by-side.

In 1970, after Luise Kaish was honored with the prestigious Rome Prize from the American Academy in Rome, Kaish and his family departed to Rome, where they lived for almost three years. Kaish continued his artistic practice in a studio at the American Academy. While there, the Kaishes forged relationships with a dynamic group of artists, writers and intellectuals, including Philip Guston, Harold Clurman, Dimitri Hadzi and Buckminster Fuller.

For over 30 years, Kaish has served and advised various arts organizations. Serving for 27 years as Vice President and board member with the Artists Fellowship, Kaish helped further the mission of the organization to assist professional artists and their families in times of emergency, disability or bereavement. At the National Academy Museum & School, he served on the Executive Committee of the Council for more than 10 years, where he also led workshops at the school, joining with other artists to promote achievement and education in the arts. Carrying out this work has connected him with many other contemporary artists, including Wolf Kahn, Jane Wilson, Will Barnet and Everett Raymond Kinstler.

From the 1970s, a variety of prestigious awards, exhibitions and artist's residencies took Kaish and his work across the country and around the world.

Kaish died in New York on October 16, 2025, at the age of 98.

=== Painter ===
Theodore Wolff situates Kaish as part of a group of artists with roots in the modernist tradition: some of whose work evolved toward "pure abstraction", others whose work gravitated toward "a modified form of representationalism", and others still toward "an imaginative synthesis of a variety of modes." He writes, "Morton Kaish is a valued member of this group, both as artist and teacher. His handsome, highly accomplished paintings grace the walls of museums and galleries and have done so for decades. He has earned the esteem of critics, the devotion of collectors, and the admiration of his peers. Everything he exhibits reflects a high level of intelligence and a creative sensibility capable of transforming even the most commonplace of objects into art."

Across the last fifty years, Kaish has been represented by Staempfli Gallery, Hollis Taggart Galleries and Irving Gallery as well as Haynes Galleries, Stremmel Gallery and Oxford Gallery, among others. Notable national and international exhibitions of Kaish's work have been held at the New School, the University of Haifa, the American Cultural Center in Rome, the American Cultural Center in Jerusalem and Dartmouth College, among others. Over the years, critics have pointed to Kaish's affinity to masters like Joaquín Sorolla—for his treatment of light and the figure—and Pierre Bonnard—for his use of color.

=== Major themes ===
Throughout the course of his career, several key themes have characterized Kaish's work. In an interview with Ira Goldberg, Director of the Art Students League, Kaish identifies them: the urban architecture visible from his studio windows, the American landscapes, and the figure.

==== Figures and interiors ====
Interiors, figures and landscapes graced Kaish's first one-person exhibition at the Staempfli Gallery in 1964. Termed a "latter-day Bonnard" by Emily Genauer, he has been praised as being "richly gifted" in "recording the movements of light across landscapes and figures that celebrate the bounty of nature and the human spirit." Whether at rest or at play, his figures exist within an atmosphere bathed in light.

Kaish's work bends towards abstraction in its experimentation with color and light. Commenting on a 1967 exhibition, TIME Magazine acclaimed Kaish's rendering of interiors, in which he adapts "the best devices of contemporary painting to limn some timeless verities." "The Music Room", for example, is described as having "all the gracious intimacy of an old Dutch parlor—open piano, children at play, light bursting through the window in an incendiary display of warmth—and yet its jubilant colors and relaxed brushwork proclaim its modern vintage."

==== Views from the studio and landscapes ====
A sensitive observer of his surroundings, Kaish became fascinated by the panoply of urban architecture visible from the windows of his Upper West Side studio. A solo exhibition at the Staempfli Gallery in 1984 centered on this theme as well as landscapes, and critics commented on Kaish's ability to infuse the urban with lushness and a sense of the exotic. In an Arts Magazine review of the show, John Gruen writes, "Morton Kaish's long involvement with the sensuousness of Impressionist color and light as seen in nature continues to be in evidence in a number of large and small garden paintings. By now, his command of the subject is nothing less than masterful; to be in the presence of these fresh and radiant paintings is to experience anew the vigorous range of the brush."

==== America ====
Following his service in the Merchant Marines during World War II, and in light of his father's military service in World War I, patriotic themes have long interested Kaish. During the 1990s Kaish's exploration of these themes culminated in two exhibitions at Hollis Taggart Galleries: "Morton Kaish: The America Series" in 1993 and "Morton Kaish, Stars and Stripes" in 1996. In his "America Series" paintings, weathered wooden structures are adorned with latches, sketches of Abraham Lincoln's profile, and battered flags. They also bear the marks of a difficult past: the names of Civil War battlefield.

Offering insight into these works, Kaish remarks: "The structures, the hardware and apertures, the light beyond, the graphic notation, and of course, the Lincoln presence speak of a time of loss, change, and inherent resiliency . . . They speak of the seasons and renewal, of fragility and monumentality. And they speak of the moment when these qualities came together in the collective American experience of the Civil War and the miracle by which America has survived."

One of the paintings from this series, which was included in the 1996 Hollis Taggart exhibition, "Stars and Stripes, Blossoms and Bridges", was selected for the cover art on the Beach Boys album Stars and Stripes Vol. 1.

==== Gallery ====
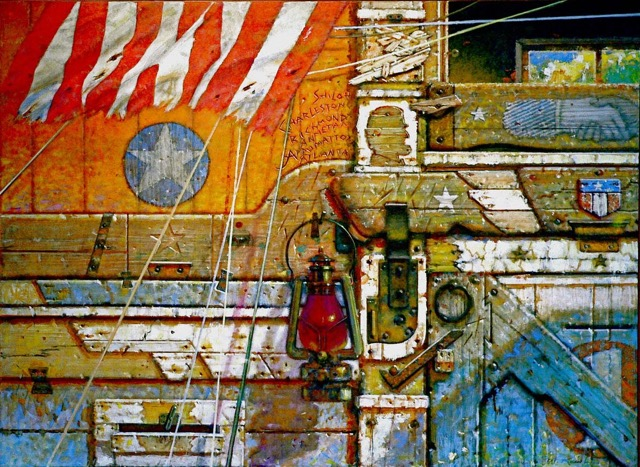
Freedom Door

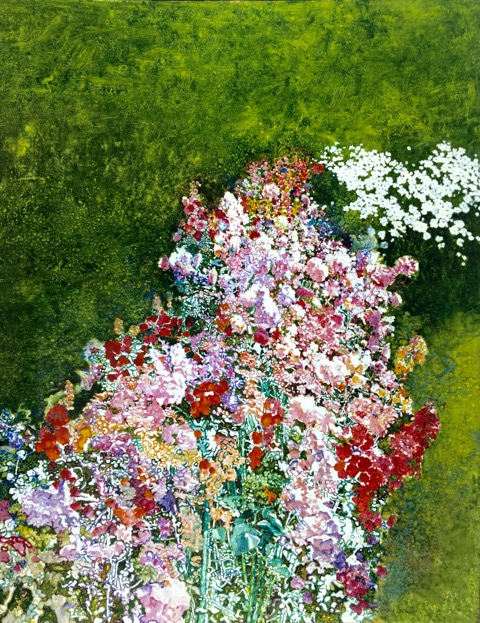
Summer Garden New York

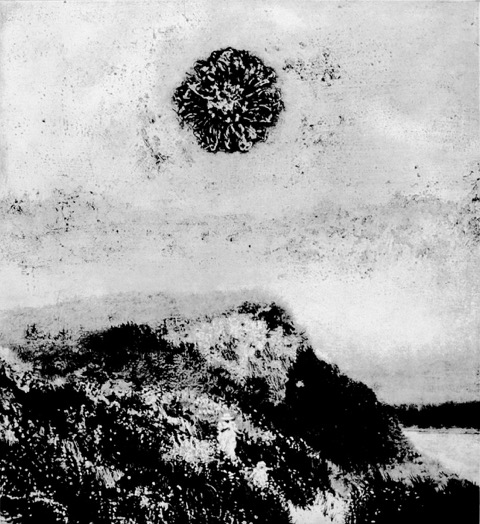
Summers End

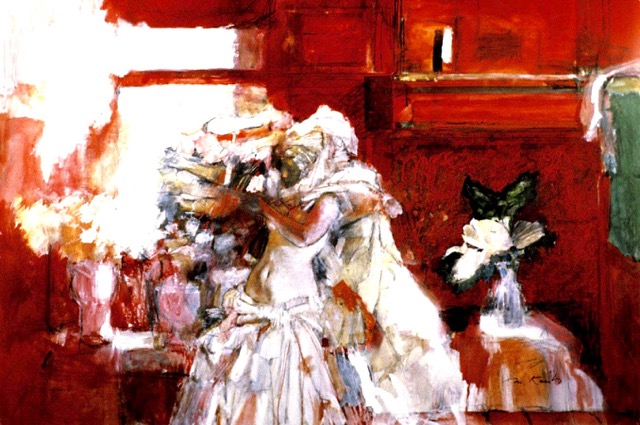
Woman Dressing with Magnolia

== Printmaker ==
Kaish's interest in printmaking extends throughout his career, and his prints often reflect the major themes outlined above.

In the record for Kaish's prints in the collection of the British Museum, the curator has included a comment from Kaish, revealing something of both the artist's inspiration and his technique: "The artist wrote to Frances Carey on 5/4/1998, saying 'It has occurred to me that a background/technical word on the making of 'Summer's End' (1998-4-26-222) and 'Evening Song' might be of interest. Though the medium is intaglio, the beginnings come from the series of brush and ink 'dune' drawings I rejoice in doing each summer on Martha's Vineyard. One finds there that confluence of sea and shore and sky, wildflowers, the change of tide and season – that speaks to us all of moments lost, though perhaps of better yet to come. The sketch was photo-transferred to a copper plate providing a basic configuration and arena for several months of work, first with etching followed by aquatint and finally drypoint. The plate was then steel-faced for completion of the edition of 30 with 5 artist's proofs.'"

== Fashion illustrator ==
To support his painting during the 1950s and 1960s, Kaish worked as a fashion illustrator for Harper's Bazaar, Esquire and Lord & Taylor. His work during this era was featured in a 2012 exhibition at the Boston Museum of Fine Arts titled "Figure/Fabric/Fantasy: Selections from the Jean S. and Frederic A. Sharf Collection of Fashion Drawing". In notes accompanying the exhibition, Sharf writes, "This exhibition marks the first time that a major American art museum has devoted an entire gallery to displaying fashion drawing ... Fashion art does more than simply illustrate a garment. It describes the social life of its moment, and opens a window into the lifestyle of the era in which it was created."

== Academic and other positions ==
For nearly 25 years, Kaish was a Professor of Art and Design at the Fashion Institute of Technology (SUNY/FIT). While at FIT, he created and led a summer study abroad program to Florence, Italy where he taught students how to combine traditional techniques used by Renaissance masters with contemporary approaches and materials. Kaish has held the position of Artist-in-Residence at Dartmouth College, the University of Washington and Haifa University, Israel, and he led workshops and courses at the New School, the National Academy and the Art Students League of New York. Through the length and breadth of his teaching career, Kaish has influenced the work of a generation of aspiring artists.

Kaish has been Visiting Artist at a number of universities across the country, including Columbia University, The Parsons School of Design, Queens College, Philadelphia College of Art, Susquehanna University and The Sedona Arts Center.

In 1989, Kaish gave the commencement address at Syracuse University's College of Visual and Performing Arts and received its Distinguished Alumni award.

Kaish served as a board member for the Century Association, the Artist's Fellowship and the Artist's Choice Museum, as well as on the council's executive committee of the National Academy Museum & School. He also received top honors from these organizations: the Benjamin West Clinedinst Memorial Medal from the Artists' Fellowship and the Lifetime Achievement Award from the National Academy.

== Museum and corporate collections ==
- Smithsonian Museum of American Art, Washington, DC
- Metropolitan Museum of Art, New York
- The British Museum, London
- Fitzwilliam Museum, Cambridge, UK
- Brooklyn Museum, Brooklyn
- National Academy Museum, New York
- Indianapolis Museum of Art
- Museum of Fine Arts, Boston
- Butler Institute of American Art, Youngstown, Ohio
- New Britain Museum of American Art, New Britain, Connecticut
- Newark Museum, Newark, New Jersey
- Memorial Art Gallery, Rochester, New York
- Hood Museum of Art, Hanover, New Hampshire
- University of Michigan Museum of Art, Ann Arbor, Michigan
- Williams College Museum of Art, Williamstown, Massachusetts
- Syracuse University Art Galleries, Syracuse, New York
- Swarthmore College, Swarthmore, Pennsylvania
- Guilford College, Greensboro, North Carolina
- Lewis and Clark College, Portland, Oregon
- Bates College Museum of Art, Lewiston, Maine
- Guild Hall, Easthampton, New York
- Shearson Lehman, New York
- Atlantic Richfield Company, La Palma, California
- J.C. Penney Co., Plano Texas
- Equitable Life Insurance Company, New York
- MBNA/ Bank of America, Charlotte, North Carolina
- Overseas Shipbuilding Group, New York
- New York Public Library Collection
- Philadelphia Print Club, Philadelphia
- Century Association Centennial Collection, New York

== Awards ==
- Andrew Carnegie Prize
- Benjamin West Clinedinst Memorial Medal, the Artists' Fellowship
- Alumni Award for Achievement in the Arts, Syracuse University
- Named as a National Academician, National Academy Museum & School
- Benjamin Altman Landscape Prize
- Gervasi Award for Painting
- Obrig Prize for Watercolor
- William A. Paton Award
- William Ward Ranger Purchase Fund Award
- National Academy Lifetime Achievement Award
- Appointed to the State University of New York Committee on Honorary Degrees
