= Luise Clayborn Kaish =

American artist (1925–2013)

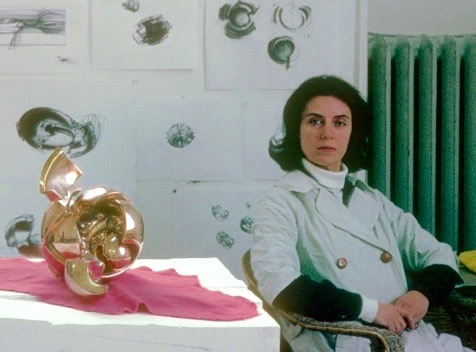
- Luise Kaish at the American Academy in Rome
- Born: September 8, 1925; Atlanta, Georgia, United States
- Died: March 7, 2013 (aged 87)
- Education: Syracuse University
- Known for: Sculpture, Painting, Collage
- Movement: Abstract Expressionism
- Spouse: Morton Kaish (married 1948)
- Awards: Rome Prize, American Academy in Rome; Guggenheim Fellowship; Louis Comfort Tiffany Foundation Grant; George Arents Award
- Website: www.luisekaish.com

Luise Clayborn Kaish (September 8, 1925 – March 7, 2013) was an American artist known for her work in sculpture, painting, and collage. Throughout her career, Kaish's work was exhibited and collected by major museums, including the Smithsonian Institution's National Museum of American Art, the Museum of Modern Art, the Whitney Museum, the Jewish Museum, and the Metropolitan Museum of Art. Kaish created monumental sculptures in bronze, aluminum, and stainless steel, which remain on view in educational, religious, and commercial settings across the United States and internationally.

== Biography ==
=== Early years and education ===
Kaish (née: Meyers) was born in Atlanta, Georgia, in 1925. Her father, Harry Meyers, was the president of the Carl Fischer Musical Instrument Company, and her early exposure to music, particularly voice, was a formative creative experience. Kaish earned her BFA from Syracuse University in 1946. After winning a grant to study internationally, she traveled to Mexico City where she collaborated with David Alfaro Siqueiros, Diego Rivera, and Pablo O'Higgins among others at Taller de Gráfica Popular and attended the Escuela de Pintura y Escultura in 1946 and 1947. In addition to working in painting, etching, and lithography, she sang with the National Conservatory chorus in Mexico City and rode with the Mexican Olympic riding team. Upon completion of her undergraduate studies, Kaish pursued an MFA from Syracuse University, which she attained while working under the mentorship of Croatian sculptor Ivan Meštrović in 1951.

=== Early career ===
Upon her return to the United States, and during her graduate studies, Kaish was commissioned to create an over-life-size bronze sculpture of Syracuse University's symbolic figure, The Saltine Warrior, which remains on display on the Syracuse campus. Following graduation, Kaish married fellow artist Morton Kaish, and they lived briefly in Rochester, New York, where she was recognized as a founding member of Rochester's Arena Group, whose interest in abstract expressionism influenced culture in upstate New York.

In 1951, Kaish's stone carving Mother and Child was chosen for inclusion in the Metropolitan Museum of Art's American Sculpture exhibition. Mother and Child was made from Onondaga bluestone, which Kaish discovered in the wreckage of a Syracuse post office and purchased from the demolition's foreman at a price of $3 per ton. "It's almost as hard as granite, compact and satisfying, and it works up into a beautiful finish. It's native to New York State, but the quarries have all been deserted, and you can't get it anymore," Kaish recounted. She purchased four tons.

Soon after participating in American Sculpture, Kaish received a Louis Comfort Tiffany Grant for travel and study in Europe. She travelled through England, France, and Belgium before settling in Italy and attending the Istituto Statale d'Arte di Firenze in Florence, where she studied stone carving and bronze casting from 1951 to 1952. A brief period back in the United States followed Kaish's work in Florence. During this time, she was invited to participate in Women Welders, held at the SculptureCenter in November 1953, which featured her work and that of other emerging artists. The exhibition received attention for its then unusual focus on women sculptors. Subsequently, Kaish returned to Italy, where she lived and worked in Rome during 1956 and 1957.

=== MacDougal Street ===
In 1958, Kaish settled into a studio space on MacDougal Street in New York City's Greenwich Village. Diverse creative achievements characterized this period of her life, including her solo exhibition at the SculptureCenter--Luise Kaish, Bronzes, which garnered enthusiastic reviews—and an invitation to participate in the Museum of Modern Art's Recent Sculpture USA in 1959. In a review of her solo show at the SculptureCenter, Robert Dash asserted, "A sudden sense of epiphany and the blistering pain of revelation infuse with grandeur forty-six exquisitely cast or welded bronzes and coppers. Miss Kaish (who studied with Maestrovich [sic] at Syracuse and who now returns from Italy after the completion of a Tiffany grant) believes that 'the poetry of creation expresses the striving of man after God and his desire to form a continuous pattern of identification with the source of all being.' It is an unusual pronunciamento. It exactly qualifies the work."

In 1959, Kaish was recognized with a Guggenheim Fellowship. Following these exhibitions and honors, Kaish received several major commissions. One was to create the ark doors for Rochester, New York's Temple B'rith Kodesh, designed by architect Pietro Belluschi. The bronze ark, measuring 13.5 feet high and 15.5 feet wide, took three years for Kaish to complete and sparked conversation over her use of figurative elements, controversial within the Orthodox tradition. During the early phase of work on the ark, Kaish and her husband had a daughter, Melissa Kaish Dorfman. Not long after finishing her work on the B'rith Kodesh ark, Kaish undertook another major commission for the Christ in Glory at the Holy Trinity Mission Seminary in Silver Spring, Maryland, designed by architect James T. Canizaro. This work, cast in bronze, was also created on a monumental scale at 13.5 feet high and 9.5 feet wide.

=== Rome Prize and Jewish Museum retrospective ===
During the late 1960s Kaish began turning more strongly to abstraction, using it to address spiritual and social themes. She was invited to participate in a 1967 exhibition at the New School Art Center called Protest and Hope: An Exhibition of Sculpture, Painting, Drawing and Prints on Civil Rights and Vietnam, which asked artists to create work specifically focused on the social turbulence of the 1960s. In the following year, Kaish had her first one-person show of sculpture at Staempfli Gallery, and she began to explore themes related to light, space, and voyages. In 1972, she was granted the Rome Prize Fellowship from the American Academy in Rome. She and her family travelled to Italy where she worked for the following three years, while also traveling throughout Europe, North Africa, and the Middle East.

A retrospective at the Jewish Museum in 1973 featured the range of Kaish's work across the previous two decades. In the exhibition catalog, Avram Kampf noted, "Freed from its fixed collective symbolism, these sculptures represent an inward voyage into the hidden recesses of the artist's self, following its delicate and secret movements . . . It is the voyage of a mystic, a restless life-long pilgrimage, passionate, exhilarating and 'unselfing,' exploring untold regions and stages of an internal universe. These new abstract works which supersede her early more expressive or romantic ones and ultimately derive from her deep mystical inclinations place her work in the mainstream of contemporary art."

=== Turn to painting and collage ===
Following her return from Rome and a residency at the MacDowell Colony, Kaish's work took a new direction: "In the seventies she turned to canvas--layering, scarring, even burning it--attacking it as a sculptor would to give it three dimensionality. In the eighties her work has become more painterly. Squares, rectangles, triangles, and shifting horizontal planes are distinguished by color as well as by abrasions of the surface." Of this shift in her work, Kaish comments, "For me, working on canvas, as a sculptor, has always been like encountering a 'stop here' sign. It's vertical, impenetrable, a wall. I want to punch a hole in it--to see the light fall, sense the space. I want to create a window, a space for one's visual imagination to move, through and into. By using the burnt canvas I was able to join my imagination with the physical needs of a sculptor: to deal at first hand with a tactile material. I build, layer, tear, and rebuild my canvas reliefs, at times contemplatively, at times in a frenzy of energy." Solo shows at the Staempfli Gallery in 1981, 1984, and 1988 featured Kaish's work in painting and collage.

== Sculptor and painter ==
=== Sculpture ===
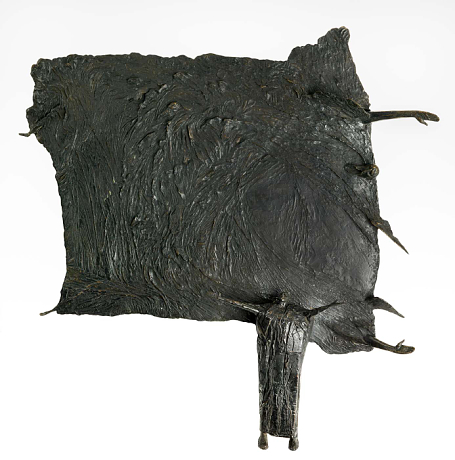
All religions must be tolerated, 1961, bronze. Smithsonian American Art Museum, Washington, D.C.

Kaish worked in bronze, stainless steel, and aluminum and focused on different motifs throughout her career, showing a range of interests from monumental bronzes dealing with biblical themes to small, expressive figures and later abstract works. Her abstract works reflected on the limitlessness of space and the universe, as seen in various exhibitions as well as in work commissioned by Continental Grain (now ContiGroup Companies) and work on permanent public display at Dartmouth College.

Major commissions from a variety of organizations and architects also led Kaish to create ark doors, memorials to the Holocaust, menorahs, and Christ figures. Kaish's sensitive treatment of the spiritual can be seen internationally at Export Khleb in Moscow and the Hebrew Union College in Jerusalem, Israel as well as within the United States at the Temple Beth Shalom in Wilmington, Delaware, Temple B’rith Kodesh in Rochester, New York, and the Holy Trinity Mission Seminary in Silver Spring Maryland, among others. In American Synagogues: A Century of Architecture and Jewish Community, Samuel Gruber calls Kaish's ark at B'rith Kodesh “one of the major works of the last half century . . . even today the presence of Kaish's figures on the ark is an exciting shock.” During the process of creating the B'rith Kodesh ark, Kaish worked closely with noted architect Pietro Belluschi.

=== Painting and collage ===
Starting in the early 1970s, Kaish began working in painting and collage. Commenting on these works, critics noted their lyricism, contemporary spirit, and the influence of abstract expressionism and cubism. In Arts Magazine, Roger Lipsey remarks, "Speaking a language of our time, they [Kaish's collages] deal with the timeless themes of art: nature and our relation to it, feeling and sensation as kinds of knowledge, the beauty of physical being." Lipsey also reflects on Kaish's trajectory from sculpture to collage: "Long known as a sculptor, with large-scale commissions in her background, Kaish brings to collage (which has concerned her since 1973) the interests of a sculptor. A work dating early in the sequence on exhibition reveals a sculptor's sensibility in its architectonic structor of overlapping planes, ambiguous spaces, and sensitivity to the mass of thin canvas stripping."

=== Notable exhibitions ===
Kaish's exhibition highlights range from solo shows including Luise Kaish, Bronzes at the SculptureCenter in 1958 and a retrospective Luise Kaish, Sculpture at the Jewish Museum in 1973 to participation in group shows like the Metropolitan Museum of Art's American Sculpture exhibition in 1951, The Women Welders exhibition at the SculptureCenter in 1953, the Museum of Modern Art's Recent Sculpture USA in 1959, and the Whitney Museum's 1964 Annual Exhibition of Contemporary American Sculpture. In addition to those listed above, solo shows focused on Kaish were held at the Century Association, New York, New York; the Fine Arts Center, Fulbright College of Fine Arts, University of Arkansas, Fayetteville, Arkansas; Staempfli Gallery, New York, New York; University of Haifa, Israel; Hopkins Center, Dartmouth College, Hanover, New Hampshire; American Academy in Rome, Rome, Italy; The Minnesota Museum of Art, St. Paul, Minnesota; and The Rochester Memorial Art Gallery, Rochester, New York.

== Museum collections ==
Works by Kaish are found in the following museum collections, among others:

- Smithsonian Institution, National Museum of American Art, Washington, DC
- The Metropolitan Museum of Art, New York, New York
- The Whitney Museum of American Art, New York, New York
- The Hood Museum, Dartmouth College, Hanover, New Hampshire
- The Jewish Museum, New York, New York
- The Minnesota Museum of Art, St. Paul, Minnesota
- The National Academy Museum & School, New York, New York

== Awards ==
Kaish's work garnered awards and fellowships including:

- Guggenheim Fellowship
- Rome Prize Fellowship (American Academy in Rome)
- The George Arents Award (2012)
- Louis Comfort Tiffany Foundation Grant

== Educational career ==
Kaish was a Professor of Visual Arts at Columbia University, where she chaired the Graduate Painting and Sculpture division. After retiring, she was named Professor Emerita and continued in an advisory role. Kaish acted as a Trustee and then Trustee Emerita of the American Academy in Rome; a Trustee and Executive Member of the Augustus Saint-Gaudens Memorial, National Park Service; a board member of the Sculptors Guild; and a member of the New York City Fine Arts Commission nominating committee. She has been Artist-in-Residence at the University of Haifa, Israel; Dartmouth College, Hanover, New Hampshire; and the University of Washington, Seattle, Washington. Kaish was elected as a National Academician in 1995. National and international conferences and institutions invited her to speak as a panelist, critic, and guest lecturer.
