= Popov =

Popov (Cyrillic: Попов; masculine), or Popova (Cyrillic: Попова; feminine), is a common Russian, Bulgarian, Macedonian and Serbian patronymic surname. Derived from a Slavonic word pop (Cyrillic: поп, "priest"). Notable people with the surname include:

== Popov ==
- Alek Popov (born 1966), Bulgarian writer
- Alexander Popov (disambiguation)
- Aleksei Popov (disambiguation)
- Anatoly Popov (born 1960), Russian politician, Prime Minister of Chechnya
- Andrei Popov (disambiguation)
- Angel Popov (born 1979), Bulgarian-born Qatari weightlifter
- Apostol Popov (born 1982), Bulgarian football player
- Blagoy Popov (1902–1968)
- Boris Popov (born 1941), Russian water polo player
- Christo Popov (born 2002), Bulgarian-born French badminton player
- Denis Popov (born 1979), Russian football player and manager
- Denis Popov, (born 2002) Russian football player
- Denys Popov (born 1999), Ukrainian football player
- Dilyana Popova (born 1981), Bulgarian actress and model
- Dimitar Popov (born 1970), Bulgarian footballer
- Dimitar Ivanov Popov (1894–1975), Bulgarian organic chemist
- Dimitar Iliev Popov (1927–2015), Bulgarian judge and Prime Minister
- Dmitri Popov (disambiguation)
- Duško Popov (1912–1981), Serbian double-agent, known as Tricycle
- Egor Popov (1913–2001), Russian-American structural and seismic engineer
- Fedot Popov (died between 1648 and 1654), Russian explorer
- Gavriil Popov (composer) (1904–1972), Russian composer
- Gavriil Popov (politician) (born 1936), Russian politician
- George Basil Popov (1922–1998) a Russian-British entomologist born in Iran
- Georgi Dimitrov Popov (1944–2024), Bulgarian football player
- Georgi Vladimirovich Popov (1912–1974), Soviet weightlifter.
- Georgy Arturovich Popov (born 2001), Russian taekwondo athlete
- Goran Popov (born 1984), Macedonian footballer
- Haralan Popov (1907–1988), Bulgarian church minister
- Hristian Popov (born 1990), Bulgarian football player
- Ilya Popov (born 2000), Russian boxer
- Ilya Popov (born 1995), Russian basketball player
- Ivan Popov (born 1975), Russian general
- Ivan Popov (born 1990), Russian chess Grandmaster
- Ivelin Popov (born 1987), Bulgarian footballer
- Katia Popov (1965–2018), Bulgarian-born American violinist
- Leonid Popov (born 1945), Soviet cosmonaut
- Luben Popov (born 1936), Bulgarian chess player
- Markian Popov (1902–1969), Soviet Army General
- Maximilian Popov (born 2008), Russian and Grenadian racing driver
- Mikhail Popov (disambiguation)
- Nikolay Popov (disambiguation)
- Oleg Popov (1930–2016), Russian circus artist
- Pavel Popov (born 1957), Russian military officer
- Polina Popova (born 1995), Miss Russia 2017
- Pyotr Popov (born 1985), Russian luger
- Pyotr Semyonovich Popov (1923–1960), Soviet intelligence officer and double agent
- Robert Popov (born 1982), Macedonian footballer
- Sergei Popov (disambiguation)
- Serhiy Popov (born 1971), Ukrainian footballer
- Stefan Popov (musician) (born 1940) a Bulgarian cellist
- Stole Popov (born 1950), Macedonian film director.
- Strahil Popov (born 1990), Bulgarian footballer
- Toma Junior Popov (born 1998), Bulgarian-born French badminton player
- Vadim Popov (1940—2026), Belarusian politician
- Valery Popov (disambiguation)
- Vasile M. Popov (born 1928), Romanian-born scientist and systems theorist
- Vasili Popov (disambiguation)
- Victor Popov (1937–1994), Russian theoretical physicist
- Vladimir Popov (disambiguation)
- Yevgeni Popov (disambiguation)
- Yuri Alexandrovich Popov (1936–2016), Russian paleoentomologist

== Popova ==
- Alena Popova, Kazakhstani volleyballer
- Daria Popova, Russian pair skater
- Diana Popova, Bulgarian gymnast
- Dina Popova (1977–2025), Ukrainian financier and entrepreneur
- Faton Popova, German footballer
- Katarzyna Popowa-Zydroń, Polish pianist and pedagogue of Bulgarian descent
- Ksenia Popova, Russian open water swimmer
- Larisa Popova, Moldovan rower
- Lyubov Popova (1889–1924), Russian avant-garde artist
- Margarita Popova, Bulgarian Minister of Justice
- Mariana Popova (born 1978), Bulgarian singer
- Nadezhda Popova, Soviet military pilot
- Natalia Popova, Ukrainian figure skater
- Natalia Popova (born 1976), Belarusian chess master
- Nina Popova (1908–1994), Soviet official
- Roza Popova (1879–1949), Bulgarian actress and theatre director
- Shenka Popova (1866–1913), Bulgarian actress
- Sofka Popova, Bulgarian runner
- Tamara Popova, Soviet sprint canoer
- Tatiana Popova (basketball), Russian basketball player
- Valentina Popova (born 1972), Russian weightlifter
- Vera Popova, Russian chemist
- Veronika Popova, Russian swimmer

== Fictional characters ==
- Nadia Popov, character in the British children's program Rentaghost
- Boris Vyacheslavovich Popov, character in Metal Gear Rising: Revengeance
- Dmitri and Maxim Popov, characters in Dungeon Crawler Carl

== Similar surnames ==
Surnames of similar derivation include Popović, Popovici, Popoff, Popkov, Poptsov (ru:Попцов), Popovski, Popovsky, Raspopov, Raspopović.
