= 1811 in Russia =

This article lists notable events that occurred in 1811 of Russia.

== Incumbents ==
- Monarch – Alexander I

== Events ==
- Japanese troops capture Vasily Golovnin for violating their policy of isolationism, resulting in the Golovnin Incident.
- The Kuban Cossack Choir is founded as the Black Sea Host Singing Chorus.
- The Kazan Cathedral finishes construction.
- Michael Andreas Barclay de Tolly publishes the "Military Regulations for Infantry Service" regulations, intending to instill more rigor in military training.
- Mikhail Kutuzov and his army defeat the Turkish troops of Laz Aziz Ahmed Pasha in the Battle of Rusçuk.
  - Mikhail Kutuzov later places troops in an investment around Slobozia, resulting in the forfeit of the Ottoman regiment led by Laz Aziz Ahmed Pasha and victory in the Battle of Slobozia.
- Mikhail Speransky implements more reforms in the Russian government.
- The Imperial Lyceum is founded by Alexander I.
- The Bolshoi Theatre burns down.
- The Great Podil fire burns large portions of Kiev, causing more than 2,000 homes to be lost.
- Tensions between France and Russia increase, as Napoleon orders the seizing of the Duchy of Oldenburg. This will eventually lead to the Treaty of Paris(24 February 1812) and the following French invasion of Russia.

== Births ==
- Viktor Balabin (d. 1864), diplomat
- Vissarion Belinsky (d. 1848), literary critic
- Nikolai Devitte (d. 1844), composer, poet, and harpist
- Alexander Fadeyev (d. 1889) - artist of heraldry and currency design
- Avrom Ber Gotlober (d. 1899), Jewish poet, writer, and historian identified with the Haskalah movement
- Napoleon Iłłakowicz (d. 1861), Polish painter and decorator
- Nachum Kaplan (d. 1879), Lithuanian Jewish Talmudist
- Volodymyr Karavayev (d. 1892), surgeon, ophthalmologist, founder of what is now the Kyiv Medical Institute
- Mikhail Lebedev (d. 1837), painter of Estonian origin
- Ivan Razgildeev (d. 1864), geologist, mineralogist, and mining engineer
- Evdokiya Rostopchina (d. 1858), poet
- Pyotr Shamshin (d. 1895), painter
- Konstantin Tarkhan-Mouravi (d. 1869), general and governor of Georgian origin

== Deaths ==
- Boruch of Medzhybizh (b. 1753), Hasidic rebbe, grandson of the Baal Shem Tov
- Garsevan Chavchavadze (b. 1757), Georgian nobleman and diplomat
- Peter Chelishchev (b. 1745), writer, ethnographer, and traveller
- Hershel of Ostropol (b. 1757), Jewish jester and figure of folklore
- Nikolay Kamensky (b. 1776), Russian general
- Aryeh Leib of Shpola (b. 1725), Hasidic rebbe, miracle-worker, faith healer
- Mikhail Abramovich Popov (b. 1753), first mayor of Perm
- Alexander Sergeyevich Stroganov (b. 1733), aristocrat, government official, man of arts and letters
- Arkady Alexandrovich Suvorov (b. 1784), general
- Ivan Yankovich (b. before 1777), general, son of Serbian immigrant Teodor Janković-Mirijevski
- Andreyan Zakharov (b. 1761), architect
