= Popović =

Popović (Serbian Cyrillic: Поповић; Serbo-Croatian pronunciation: [pǒpoʋitɕ]) or Popovytch (Ukrainian: Попо́вич) or Popovič or Popovich or Popovitch (Russian: Попо́вич) is a common Belarusian, Bosnian, Croatian, Montenegrin, Romanian, Russian, Serbian and Ukrainian surname, and sometimes a patronymic meaning son of a priest.

== Geographical distribution ==
As of 2014, the frequency of the surname Popović was highest in Montenegro (1: 68), followed by Serbia (1: 145), Bosnia and Herzegovina (1: 354), Croatia (1: 690), Slovenia (1: 1,485) and North Macedonia (1: 2,066).

The frequency of the surname Popovich was highest in Ukraine (1: 1,530), followed by Moldova (1: 4,735), Belarus (1: 9,762) and Russia (1: 10,762).

== People with the surname ==
- Aleksandar Popović (disambiguation), multiple people
- Sasha Montenegro, Montenegrin-Mexican actress born Aleksandra Aćimović Popović
- Alyosha Popovich, a bogatyr (i.e., a medieval Russian knight-errant)
- Ana Popović, Serbian blues musician
- Andrija Popović, former Montenegrin waterpolo player, Member of Montenegrin Parliament
- Anton Popovič, Slovak translation scientist and text theoretician
- Balša Popović, Serbian footballer
- Barbara Popović, Macedonian singer
- Bogdan Popović, Serbian literary critic and historian. Brother of Pavle Popović, also a literary critic
- Bojan Popović, Serbian basketball player
- Bojana Popović, Montenegrin handball player
- Boris Popovič, Slovene politician and entrepreneur
- Boris Popovich, Russian international footballer
- Constantin Popovici, Romanian platform diver
- Minja Popović, Serbian footballer
- Cvjetko Popović, member of Mlada Bosna
- Daniel (Montenegrin singer), Croatian singer Danijel Popović
- Davorin Popović, singer, longtime frontman of Indexi
- Dimitrije Popović, Croatian painter
- Dragana Popović, Yugoslav-American physicist
- Dušan Popović (disambiguation), several people
- Evgenije Popović, Montenegrin politician, writer and diplomat
- Greg Popovich, American business executive
- Gregg Popovich (born 1949), American basketball coach
- Hristina Popović (born 1982), Serbian actress
- Ioan Popovici-Bănățeanul, an Austro-Hungarian-born Romanian prose writer and poet
- Janko Popović Volarić (born 1980), Croatian actor
- Joško Popović, Croatian national football team player
- Jovan Sterija Popović, Serbian playwright
- Jovana Popović, Serbian basketball player
- Justin Popović, Christian Orthodox theologian
- Koča Popović, Serbian communist politician
- Krsto Zrnov Popović, Montenegrin captain
- Lazar Popović, Serbian football player
- Lea Popovičová (born 2007), Slovak speed skater
- Leona Popović, Croatian alpine ski racer
- Ljuba Popović, Serbian surrealist painter
- Marina Popovich, a Soviet test pilot, Pavel Popovich's wife
- Marko Popović (born 1982), Croatian basketball player
- Mark Popovic, Canadian hockey player of Serbian descent
- Marko Popović (disambiguation),
- Marko Miljanov Popović, Montenegrin writer
- Mića Popović, Serbian painter
- Mihai Popovici, an Austro-Hungarian-born Romanian politician
- Danijel (singer), Montenegrin singer Milan Popović
- Milan Popović (disambiguation), several people
- Milentije Popović, Serbian communist politician
- Milt Popovich, American former National Football League player
- Mina Popović, Serbian national volleyball team player
- Miodrag Popović, Serbian actor
- Nebojša Popović, Serbian basketball player, coach and administrator
- Oliver Popović, Serbian basketball player and coach
- Paul Popovich, former Major League Baseball player
- Paul Popowich, Canadian actor
- Pavle Popović, Serbian literary critic and historian
- Pavel Popovich, Soviet cosmonaut
- Petar Popović (Croatian basketballer)
- Petar Popović (Serbian basketballer)
- Peter Popovic, Swedish ice hockey defenceman
- Peter S. Popovich, American lawyer, politician, and judge
- Sanja Popović, Croatian volleyball player
- Saša Popović, Serbian businessman, entrepreneur, musician and TV personality
- Silvija Popović, Serbian national volleyball player
- Srđa Popović (activist), Serbian activist of Otpor!
- Srđa Popović (lawyer), Yugoslav and Serbian civil rights lawyer and activist
- Tiberiu Popoviciu, Romanian mathematician
- Tony Popovic, Australian football (soccer) coach of Croatian descent
- Vasilije Popović (disambiguation), multiple people
- Vladica Popović, Serbian football player
- Vladimir Popović (disambiguation), multiple people
- Yaroslav Popovych, Ukrainian professional cyclist
- Zoran Popovich (1931–2018), Pennsylvania mayor and judge

== See also ==
- Popowicz
- Popov
- Popovici
- Popovitsa
