= Popov (disambiguation) =

Popov is a common Russian, Bulgarian and Serbian last name.

Popov may also refer to:

== Places ==
- Popov (crater), a lunar crater
- Popov Island, a Russian island in the Sea of Japan
- Popov Manor House, a castle in Ukraine
- Popov, a village and part of Kostelec (Tachov District) in the Czech Republic
- Popov, a village and part of Štítná nad Vláří-Popov in the Czech Republic

== Other ==
- Popov (vodka), American brand of vodka
- Faddeev–Popov ghost, an object in theoretical physics
- Popov attack, a variation in the Ruy Lopez chess opening, named after Bulgarian chess correspondence Grandmaster Georgi Alexandrov Popov, born 1937.

== See also ==
- Popovo (disambiguation)
- Popovka (disambiguation)
- Popoff
