= Alexander Fadeyev =

Alexander Fadeyev may refer to:

- Alexander Fadeyev (artist) (1811–1889), Russian artist
- Alexander Fadeyev (writer) (1901–1956), Soviet writer
- Alexandre Fadeev (born 1964), Soviet/Russian figure skater

== See also ==
- Fadeyev, a surname
