= Popovici =

Popovici (from Slavic popovich, son of a priest) is a Romanian surname:

- Alexandru Popovici (Moldovan footballer) (born 1977), Moldovan footballer
- Alexandru Adrian Popovici (born 1988), Romanian footballer
- Atanasie Popovici (c. 1887–1958), Serbian Romanian schoolteacher, minority rights activist and irredentist
- Aurel Popovici (1863–1917), Austro-Hungarian ethnic Romanian lawyer and politician
- Constantin Popovici (born 1988), Romanian diver
- Constantin Popovici (scholar) (1924–2010), Ukrainian Moldovan scholar
- David Popovici (born 2004), Romanian swimmer
- Dorin Popovici (born 1996), Moldovan footballer
- Doru Popovici (1932–2019), Romanian composer
- Dumitru Popovici (1902–1952), Romanian literary historian
- Dumitru Popovici (footballer), (born 1983), Moldovan footballer
- Elise Popovici (1921-2011), Romanian composer
- Eusebie Popovici (1863-1937), Romanian politician and teacher
- Eusebiu Popovici (1838-1922), Romanian cleric and professor
- Fred Popovici, (born 1948), Romanian composer
- George Popovici (1863–1905), Romanian poet and politician
- Gheorghe Popovici (1859–1933), Romanian painter
- Ioan Popovici (brigadier general) (1865–1953), Romanian general
- Ioan Popovici (divisional general) (1857–1956), Romanian general
- Ioan Popovici-Bănățeanul (1869–1893), Austro-Hungarian and Romanian writer
- Traian Popovici (1892–1946), Romanian lawyer and mayor of Cernăuți

== See also ==
- Popov
- Popović
