= Vladimir Popov =

Vladimir Popov may refer to:

- Vladimir Popov (1875–1942), Russian author
- Vladimir Popov (actor) (1889–1968), Russian actor; see Anna Karenina (1953 film)
- Vladimir Popov (admiral) (1857–19XX), Imperial Russian admiral
- Vladimir Popov (animator) (1930–1987), Soviet animated films director
- Vladimir Popov (footballer) (born 1978), Russian footballer
- Vladimir Popov (geographer) (1912–1998), Bulgarian geographer
- Vladimir Popov (wrestler) (1962–2025), Russian wrestler
- Vladimir Popov (weightlifter) (born 1977), Moldovan weightlifter
- Vladimir Popov (mathematician) (born 1946), Russian mathematician
- Vladimir Popov, architect of St. Alexandra's Church, Rostov-on-Don, Russia
- Vladimir A. Popov, composer of the anthem "My Beloved Arctic"

== Fictional characters ==
- Vladimir Popov, a villain in the 2002 James Bond film Die Another Day
