= Vasilije =

Vasilije (Cyrillic: Василије) is a South Slavic masculine given name, a variant of Greek given name Vassilios ("Basil"). It may refer to:

- Vasilije, Serbian Patriarch (fl. 1763–1765), Serbian cleric born Vasilije Jovanović-Brkić
- Vasilije Calasan (born 1981), French racing driver
- Vasa Čarapić (1768–1806), Serbian voivode (military commander)
- Vasa Jovanović (1874–1970), Serbian lawyer, politician, founder of the Chetnik movement and a founding member of the League of Nations
- Vasilije Krestić (born 1932), Serbian

intellectual and historian, and a member of the Serbian Academy of Sciences and Arts

- Vasilije Markovic (born 2008), Austrian footballer
- Vasilije Martinović (born 2003), Serbian water polo player
- Vasilije Matić (1906–1981), forestry expert born in Srpske Moravice
- Vasilije Micić (born 1994), Serbian basketball player
- Vasilije Mokranjac (1923–1984), Serbian composer
- Vasa Pelagić (1833–1899), Bosnian Serb writer, physician, educator, clergyman, nationalist and proponent of utopian socialism
- Vasilije Petrović (1709–1766), Prince Bishop of Montenegro
- Vasilije Popović (disambiguation), multiple people
- Vasilije Prodanović (born 1985), Serbian footballer
- Vasilije Radović (1938–2019), Yugoslav football goalkeeper and manager
- Vasilije Šijaković (1929–2003), Montenegrin football player
- Vasilije Tomović (1906–1994), Montenegrin chess master
- Vasilije Trbić (1881–1962), Serbian Chetnik leader and politician
- Vasa Živković (1819–1891), Serbian poet and Orthodox priest

== See also ==
- Monastery Saint Vasilije Ostroški, Serbian Orthodox monastery in the center of Bijeljina, Republika Srpska, Bosnia and Herzegovina
