= Boris Popovic =

Boris Popovic may refer to:

- Boris Popovich (1896-1943), Russian football midfielder
- Boris Popovič (born 1962), Slovene politician
- Boris Popović (born 2000), Serbian football defender
