= Eusebiu =

Eusebiu or Eusebie is a Romanian male given name that may refer to:

- Eusebiu Camilar (1910–1965), Romanian writer
- Eusebiu Diaconu (born 1981), Romanian Greco-Roman wrestler
- Eusebie Popovici (1863-1937), Romanian politician
- Eusebiu Popovici (1838–1922), Romanian author
- Eusebiu Ștefănescu (1944–2015), Romanian actor
- Eusebiu Tudor (born 1974), Romanian football midfielder manager
