= Popkov =

Popkov (Russian: Попков) is a Russian masculine surname originating from the Russian masculine given name Pop (meaning priest), its feminine counterpart is Popkova. Notable persons with that name include:

- Aleksandr Popkov (born 1994), Russian swimmer
- Jurijs Popkovs (born 1961), Latvian footballer and football manager
- Mikhail Popkov (born 1964), Russian serial killer and police officer
- Natalya Popkova (born 1988), Russian long-distance runner
- Sergei Popkov (born 1963), Russian football coach
- Vera Popkova (1943–2011), Soviet sprinter
- Viktor Popkov (1946–2001), Russian human rights activist and journalist
- Vitaly Popkov (1922–2010), Soviet military aviator
- Vitaly Popkov (cyclist) (born 1983), Ukrainian racing cyclist

== See also ==
- House of Popkov
- Papkov
- Popov
- Popków
