= Popovsky (surname) =

Popovsky, feminine: Popovskaya is a Russian surname.

- Lyudmila Popovskaya
- Nikolay Popovsky

== See also ==
- Popovskaya, Totemsky District, Vologda Oblast
- Popovski
