= Aleksandr Popov =

Aleksandr or Alexander Popov may refer to:

== Science ==
- Aleksandr Popov (geologist) (1913–1993), Soviet permafrost researcher
- Aleksandr Popov (chemist) (1840–1881), Russian organic chemist
- Aleksandr Popov (physicist) (1859–1906), Russian physicist

== Sports ==
- Aleksandr Popov (weightlifter) (born 1959), Soviet weightlifter
- Aleksandr Popov (biathlete) (born 1965), Russian biathlete
- Aleksandr Popov (footballer) (born 1971), Russian footballer
- Aleksandr Popov (swimmer) (born 1971), Russian swimmer
- Aleksandr Popov (volleyball coach) (born 1972), Bulgarian volleyball player and coach
- Aleksandr Popov (canoeist) (born 1975), Uzbekistani sprint canoeist
- Aleksandr Popov (ice hockey) (born 1980), Russian professional ice hockey forward
- Aleksandr Popov (figure skater) (born 1984), Russian pair skater

== Other ==
- Alexander Popov (film), a 1949 film about the Russian physicist Alexander Stepanovich Popov
- Alexander Popov (historian) (1841–1881), Russian historian, discoverer of the Nominalia of the Bulgarian khans
- Alex Popov (architect) (born 1942), Australian architect
- Alex Popov, the plaintiff in the property law case of Popov v. Hayashi

== See also ==
- Alex Popow (born 1975), Venezuelan racing driver
- Popov
