= Papkov =

Papkov (feminine: Papkova) is a Russian surname.

- Irina Papkova
- Polikarp Papkov (1760–1817), Russian general
- Pyotr Papkov

== See also ==
- Popkov
