= Vasili Popov =

Vasili Popov may refer to:

- Vasily Stepanovich Popov (1894–1967), Soviet general
- Vasili Stepanovich Popov (1745–1822), Russian general
- Vasili Popov (politician), Soviet politician who was Minister of Finance of the RSFSR
- Vasily Nikolaevich Popov (b. 1983), Russian poet, interpreter and painter.
