= Udești =

- Commune
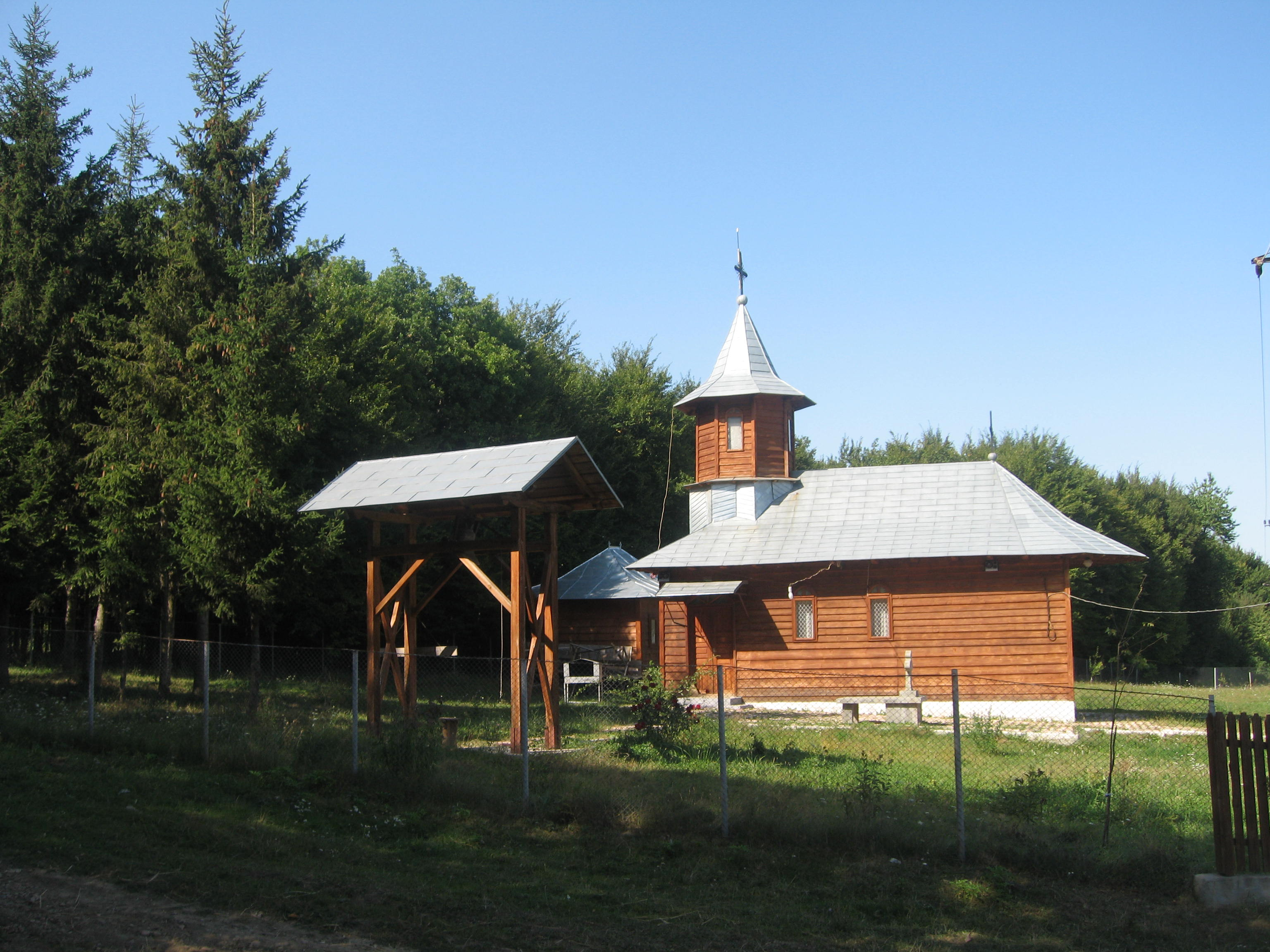
- Wooden Orthodox church in Udești

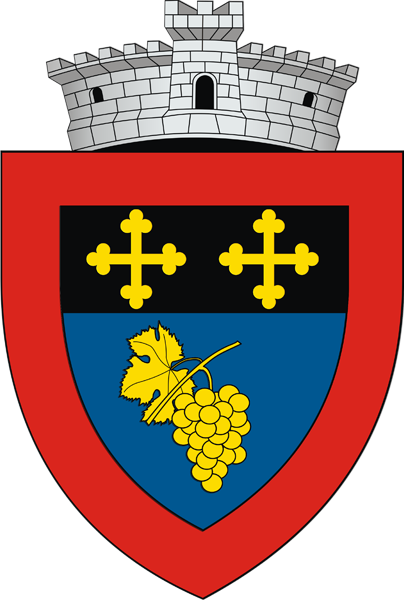
- Coat of arms

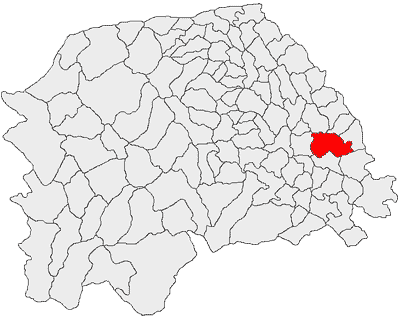
- Location in Suceava County

- Location in Romania
- Coordinates: 47°34′N 26°25′E
- Country: Romania
- County: Suceava
- Area: 78.4 km^{2} (30.3 sq mi)
- Elevation: 287 m (942 ft)
- Population (2021-12-01): 7,384
  - Density: 94.2/km^{2} (244/sq mi)
- Time zone: UTC+02:00 (EET)
  - Summer (DST): UTC+03:00 (EEST)
- Postal code: 727535
- Area code: (+40) 02 30
- Vehicle reg.: SV
- Website: www.primariaudesti.ro

Udești (German: Uydestie) is a commune located in Suceava County, Bukovina, northeastern Romania. It is composed of eleven villages: Chilișeni (German: Chilischeni), Luncușoara (German: Lunkuschora), Mănăstioara, Plăvălari (German: Rus. Plawalar; formerly Rusii Plavalarilor), Poieni-Suceava (German: Pojeni Russ., formerly Rusii Poienilor), Racova, Reuseni, Rușii-Mănăstioara, Securiceni (German: Sekuriczeni), Știrbăț, and Udești.

== Natives ==
- Eusebiu Camilar (1910–1965), writer and translator, corresponding member of the Romanian Academy
- Eusebie Popovici (1863–1937), politician and teacher
- Traian Popovici (1892–1946), lawyer and mayor of Cernăuți during World War II
