= Mikhail Popov =

Mikhail Popov may refer to:

- Mikhail Abramovich Popov (1753–1811), Russian businessman and politician, first mayor of Perm
- Mikhail Ivanovich Popov (1742–1790), Russian writer and poet
- Mikhail Grigorevich Popov (1893–1955), Russian botanist
- Mikhail Yuryevich Popov (born 1985), Russian footballer
- Mikhail Popov (athlete), Paralympic athlete from Russia
- Mihail Popov, (born 1976) Bulgarian and French badminton player
- Major General Mikhail Popov, (born 1963) Commander of the Bulgarian Land Forces
- Mikhail Vasilyevich Popov, (born 1945) Russian philosopher and economist
