= Vasylivka =

City in Zaporizhzhia Oblast, Ukraine

Vasylivka Василівка
- City
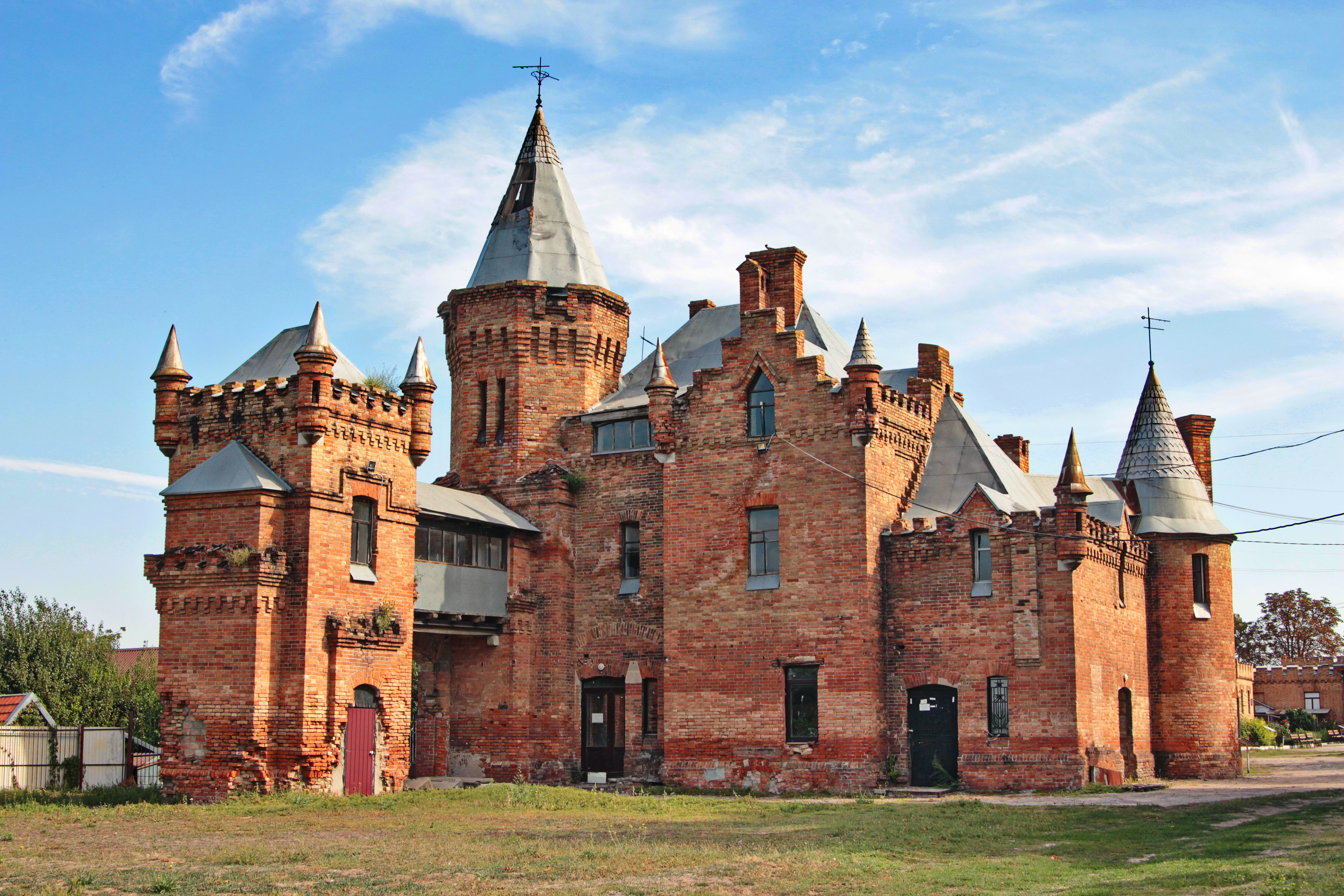
- Popov Manor House

- Flag Coat of arms
- Interactive map of Vasylivka
- Location within Zaporizhzhia Oblast Location within Ukraine
- Coordinates: 47°26′35″N 35°16′55″E
- Country: Ukraine
- Oblast: Zaporizhzhia Oblast
- Raion: Vasylivka Raion
- Hromada: Vasylivka urban hromada
- Founded: 1784
- City rights: 1957

Area
  - Total: 10.23 km^{2} (3.95 sq mi)

Population (2022)
  - Total: 12,567
  - Density: 1,228/km^{2} (3,182/sq mi)
- Postal code: 71602
- Area code: +380-6175
- Climate: Dfa

Vasylivka (Ukrainian: Василівка, IPA: [ʋɐˈsɪl⁽ʲ⁾iu̯kɐ]; Russian: Васильевка, romanized: Vasilyevka, IPA: [vɐˈsʲilʲjɪfkə]) is a city in Zaporizhzhia Oblast in southern Ukraine. It serves as the administrative center of Vasylivka Raion. The city is situated on the banks of the Kakhovka Reservoir on the Dnieper. Population: 12,567 (2022 estimate).

== History ==
At least since the 16th century, the area belonged to the Zaporozhian Sich. The first settlements in place of Vasylivka are mentioned as early as 1730s when some khutirs and zymivnyki (winter settlements) appeared on the banks of Konka river and were referred to as "Kozatski Khutory".

Following the 1775 liquidation of the Zaporozhian Sich and the 1783 annexation of the Crimea, in 1788, Catherine II of Russia granted the region to a landlord Vasili Stepanovich Popov, a Russian general who was a chief of staff of Grigory Potemkin as his manor still bears. Popov also erected a temple dedicated to the saint Basil the Great. The settlement around that church became known as Vasylivka. Beside the local Zaporozhian Cossacks, the area saw influx of the Popov's serfs from other neighboring gubernias Chernigov, Poltava and Ekaterinoslav. The settlement was part of the Melitopol county (uyezd) within the Taurida Governorate.

A grandson of General Popov built the Popov Manor House in Vasylivka. The residence was visited by Anton Makarenko in 1925.

During the World War II, near Vasylivka existed the German Panther–Wotan line along Molochna river.

In January 1989, according to the census, population was 16,325. In January 2013, population was 13,996.

Vasylivka was captured by Russian forces on 2 March 2022, during the 2022 Russian invasion of Ukraine.

On 12 December 2022, Russian forces began preparing to evacuate the citizens of Vasylivka. The following week, Ukrainian artillery struck Russian positions in the city, destroying military equipment.

On 4 January 2023, Ukrainian forces shelled the headquarters of Russian troops stationed in Vasylivka. Pro-Russian news sources claimed that the strike hit an apartment building and that six people were killed in the strike.

== Demographics ==
Ethnic groups and linguistic composition according to the 2001 Ukrainian census:

Ethnic groups in Vasylivka
	percent
Ukrainians	82.30%
Russians	14.99%
Armenians	0.64%
Belarusians	0.55%
Bulgarians	0.46%
Others	1.06%

Native languages in Vasylivka
Languages	percent
Ukrainian	77.1%
Russian	21.8%
Armenian	0.5%
Others	0.6%

== Gallery ==
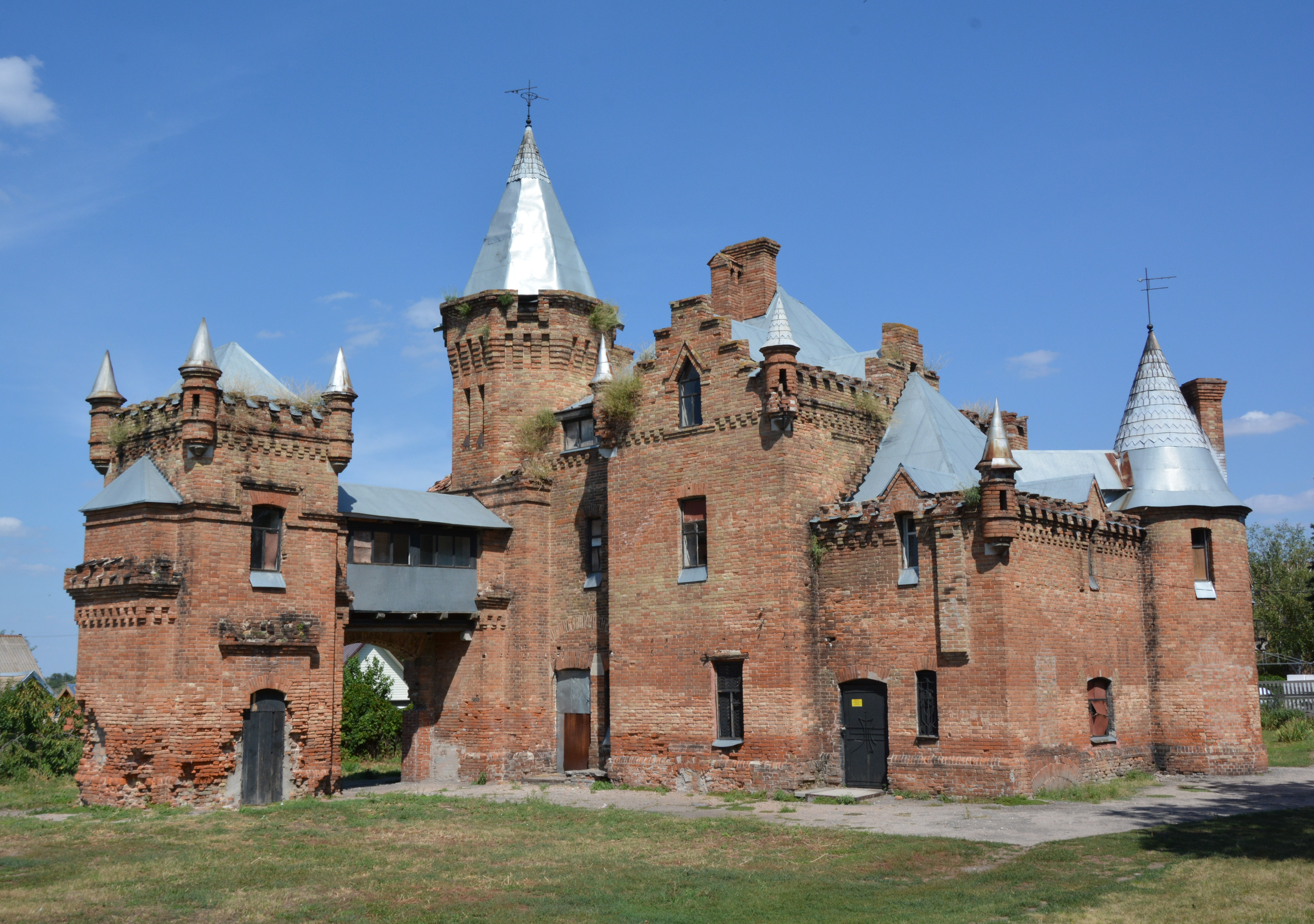
Popov Castle (back view)

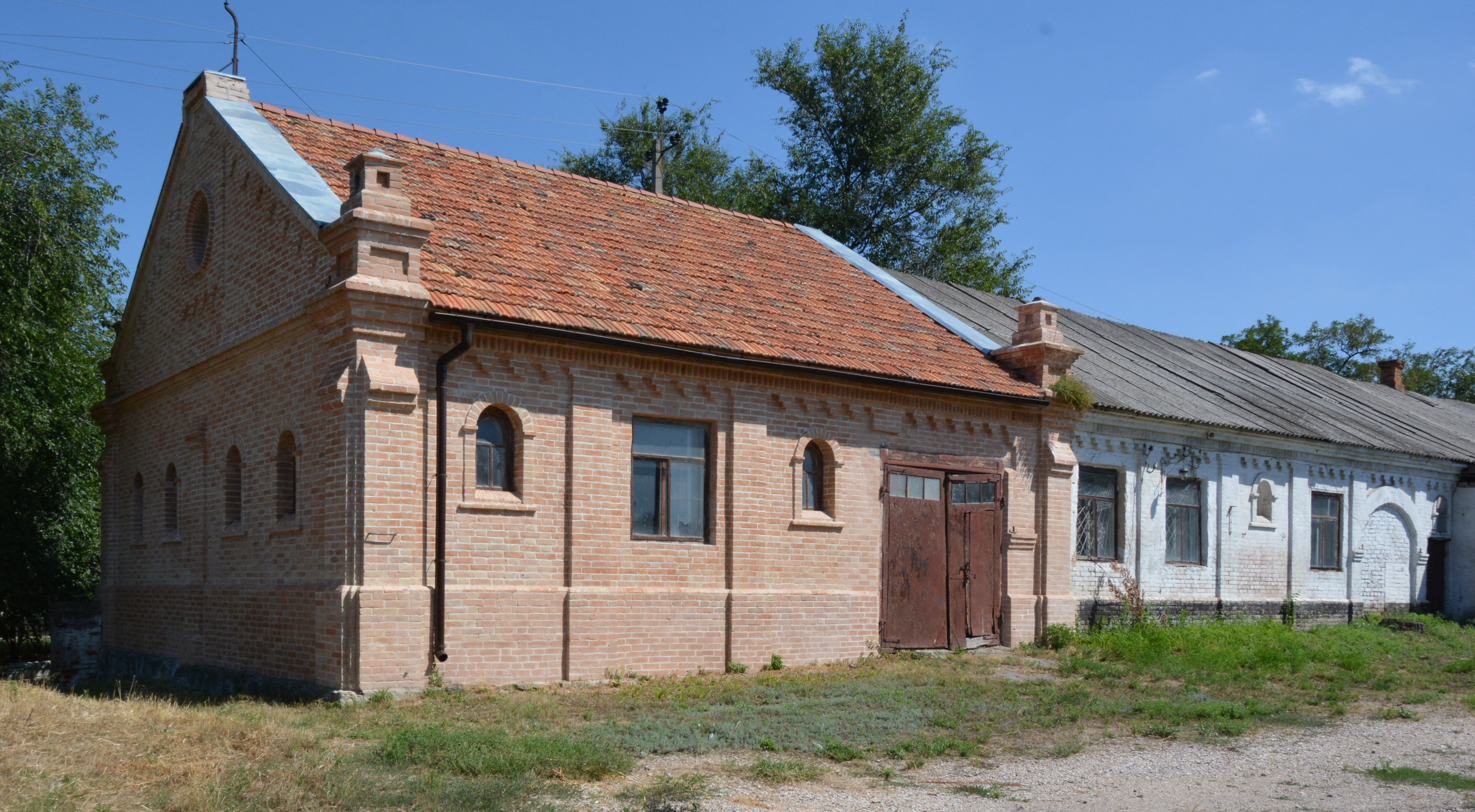
Old district of Vasylivka

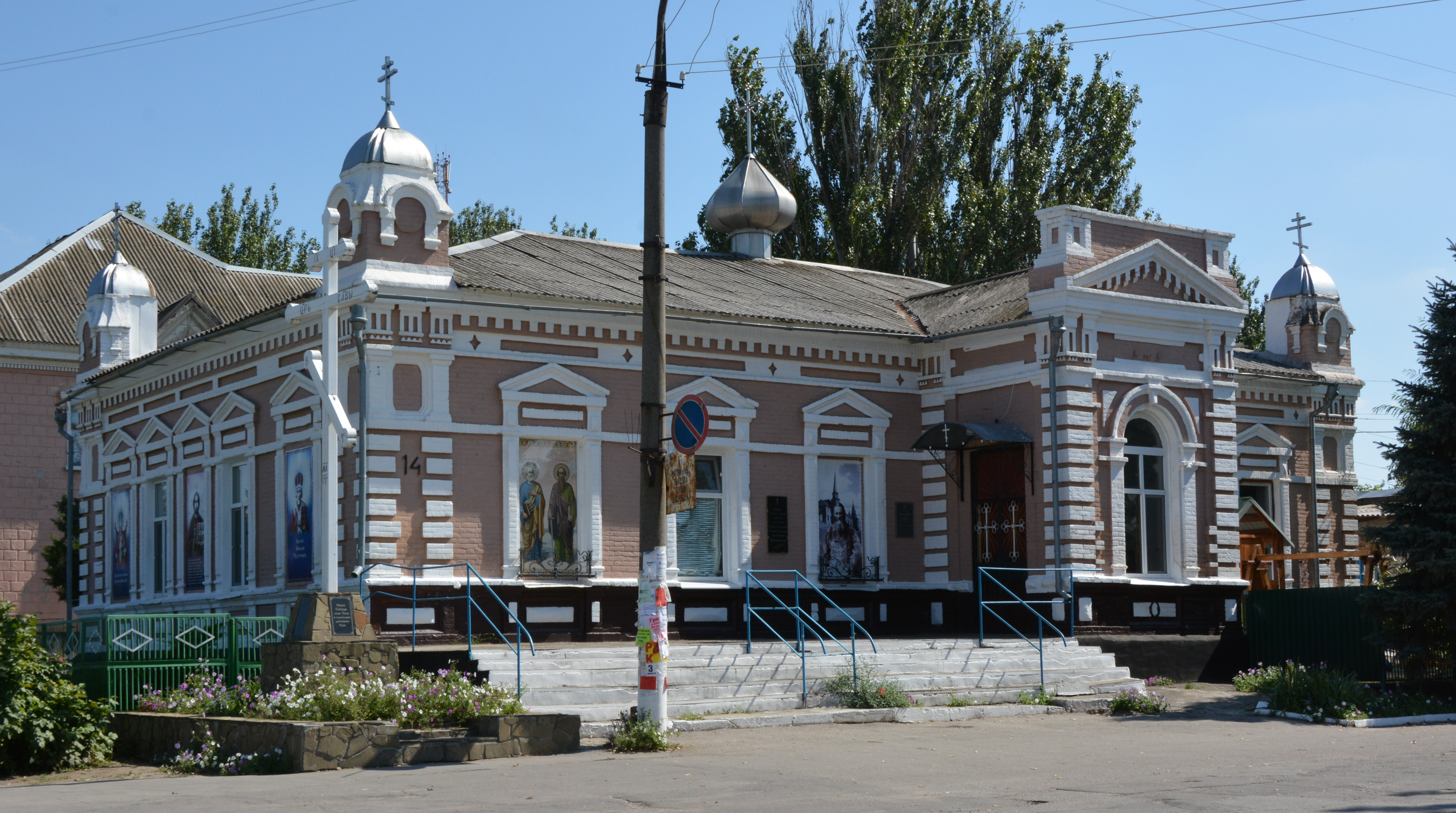
Former school

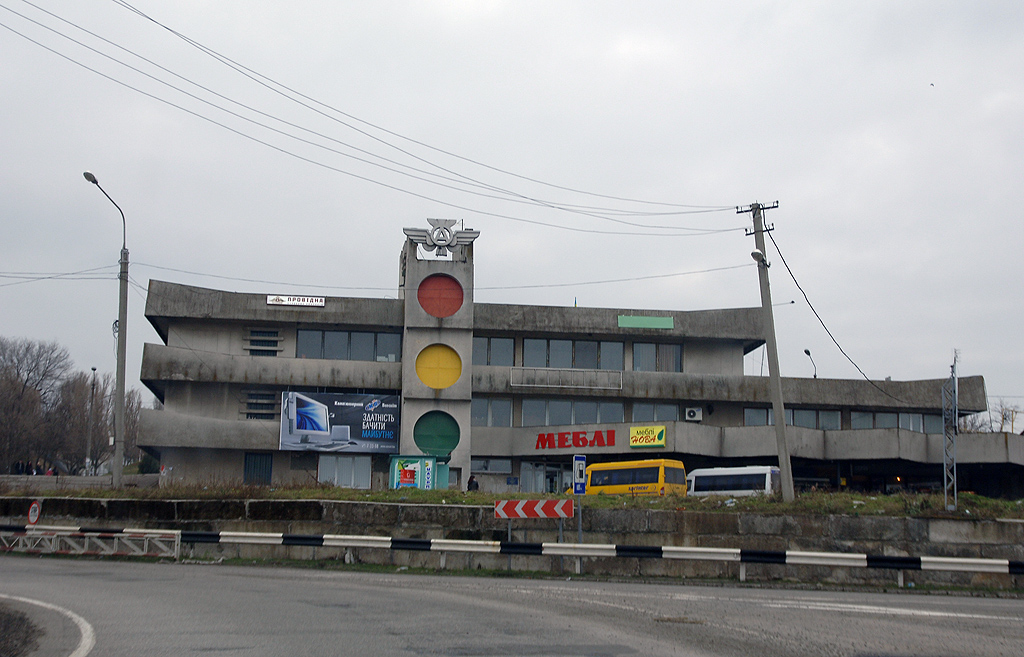
Bus station

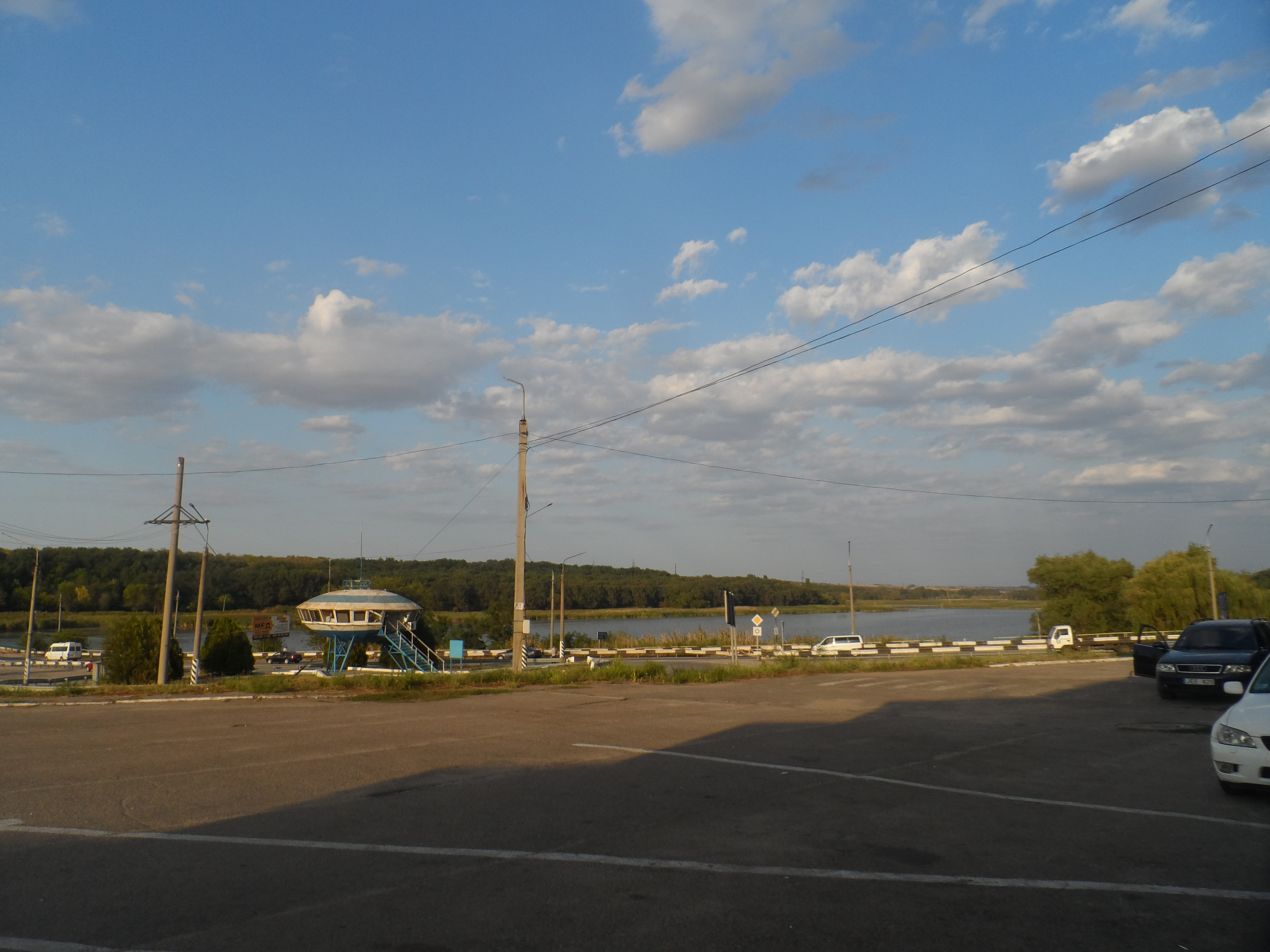

== Notable people ==
- Mykhailo Fedorov (born 1991), Ukrainian politician and businessman, who is currently serving as the Minister of Defence of Ukraine
- Yulia Yatsyk (born 1979), Ukrainian politician (Radical Party)
