= Yulia Yatsyk =

Ukrainian politician

- Юлія Яцик
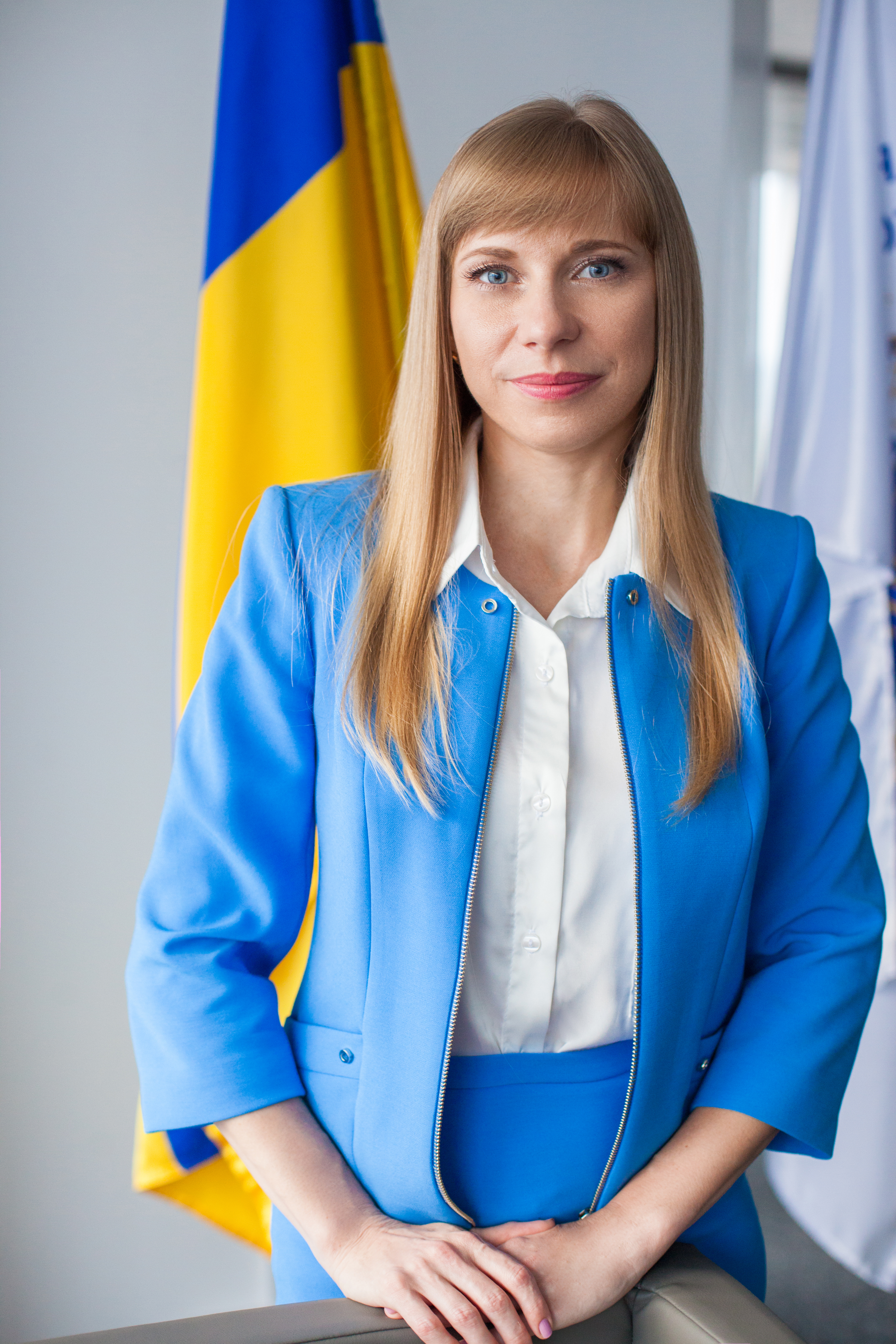

People's Deputy of Ukraine
- Incumbent
- Assumed office 29 August 2019
- Preceded by: Volodymyr Bandurov
- Constituency: Zaporizhzhia Oblast, No. 79

Personal details
- Born: 14 August 1979 (age 46) Vasylivka, Ukrainian SSR, Soviet Union (now Ukraine)
- Party: Servant of the People
- Other political affiliations: Radical Party of Oleh Liashko

Yulia Hryhorivna Yatsyk (Ukrainian: Юлія Григорівна Яцик; born 14 August 1979) is a Ukrainian politician currently serving as a People's Deputy of Ukraine representing Ukraine's 79th electoral district as a member of Servant of the People since 2019. Prior to her election, she was a lawyer.

== Early life and career ==
Yulia Hryhorivna Yatsyk was born on 14 August 1979 in the city of Vasylivka, in Ukraine's southern Zaporizhzhia Oblast. She is a graduate of the European University, specialising in finance, information systems, management, and business. She also graduated from the Zaporizhzhia Judicial Institute of the Ministry of Internal Affairs of Ukraine, specialising in criminal law. From 2002 to 2006, Yatsyk worked in the Main Department of State Inspection for Price Controls in Zaporizhzhia Oblast. She then moved to the private field, working at the legal department of ITTs "ATP" ZAT, where she worked for two years before becoming deputy chair of the legal management board of NDI Peretvoriuvach. She worked at that position until 2011.

From 2011 to 2018, Yatsyk was general director of the Diksi Law Firm, as well as head of the Yulia Yatsyk Legal Company.

== Political career ==
In the 2012 Ukrainian parliamentary election, Yatsyk was an unsuccessful candidate for People's Deputy of Ukraine from the Radical Party of Oleh Liashko, placed 28th on the party's electoral list.

In the 2019 Ukrainian parliamentary election, Yatsyk was again a candidate for People's Deputy, this time as the candidate of Servant of the People in Ukraine's 79th electoral district. At the time, she was a member of the Servant of the People party. She was successfully elected, winning with 38.45% of the vote. Her closest opponent was Opposition Platform — For Life candidate (and incumbent People's Deputy) Volodymyr Bandurov, who gathered 24.28% of the vote.

In the Verkhovna Rada (Ukraine's parliament), Yatsyk joined the Servant of the People faction and the Verkhovna Rada Law Enforcement Committee. In March 2020, Yatsyk was one of multiple People's Deputies to sign an open letter opposing the proposal of the Trilateral Contact Group on Ukraine to include separatists from the Donbas in negotiations. In 2022, she left the Servant of the People party, but remained as a member of the faction.

Yatsyk was also an unsuccessful candidate for head of the National Anti-Corruption Bureau of Ukraine in 2022. Her candidacy was criticised by the Anti-Corruption Action Center due to her hiring of a business partner as her assistant, in violation of anti-corruption laws. The same year, she urged People's Deputies to vote against proposed urban planning reforms, accusing the draft law of reducing the powers of local governments.
