= Vladimir Popović =

Vladimir Popović may refer to:

- Vladimir Popović (politician) (1914–1972), Yugoslav diplomat and politician
- Vladimir Popović (actor) (1935–1981), Montenegrin actor
- Vladimír Popovič (1939–2025), Slovak painter, visual artist, and professor
- Vladica Popović (1935–2020), Yugoslav footballer who played in the 1962 FIFA World Cup
- Vladimir Popović (footballer, born 1976), former Montenegrin footballer
- Vladimir Popović (basketball) (born 1982), Serbian professional basketball player

== See also ==
- Popović
