= Dmitri Popov (disambiguation) =

Dmitri Popov (born 1967) is a Russian footballer.

Dmitri Popov may also refer to:

- Dmitry Ivanovich Popov (1892–1921), revolutionary of Russia
- Dmitry Yakovlevich Popov (1863–1921), Russian priest and revolutionary, a deputy of the Fourth Imperial Duma

== See also ==
- Dmitri Sinodi-Popov (1855–1910), Russian artist
