= Sergei Popov =

Sergei Popov may refer to:

- Sergey Popov (politician, born 1948), Russian politician and member of the Duma
- Sergey Aleksandrovich Popov (born 1949) Russian politician
- Sergei Popov (footballer) (born 1987), Russian footballer
- Sergei Popov (marathon runner) (1930–1995), Soviet marathon runner
- Sergey Popov (politician, born 1960), Russian politician and economist
- Sergei Popov (businessman) (born 1971), Russian businessman and billionaire
- Serhiy Popov (born 1971), Ukrainian footballer
- Sergey Popov (rugby union) (born 1982), Russian rugby union player and coach
- Sergei Popov (bioweaponeer), Soviet Union bio-weapons scientist; defector to USA
- Sergey Popov (hurdler) (1929–2018), Soviet Olympic hurdler
- Sergey Popov (guitarist) (born 1959), Russian musician, guitarist and songwriter
- Sergiy Popov (beach volleyball) (born 1991), Ukrainian beach volleyball player
- Sergei Popov (general), Russian general, commander of the 1st Special Purpose Air and Missile Defense Army 2011–2013
