= Aleksei Popov =

Aleksei Popov may refer to:

- Aleksey Popov (director) (1891–1961), Soviet theatre director
- Alexey Popov (journalist) (born 1974), Russian journalist
- Aleksei Popov (footballer, born 1978), Kazakhstani football manager and former centre-back
- Aleksei Popov (footballer, born 1990), Russian football forward
