= Fadeyev =

Fadeyev or Fadeev (Russian: Фадеев, IPA: [fɐˈdʲe(j)ɪf]) and Fadeyeva or Fadeeva (feminine; Russian: Фадеева, IPA: [fɐˈdʲe(j)ɪvə]) is a common Russian last name and may refer to:

- Alexander Fadeyev (artist) (1811–1889), Russian artist
- Alexander Alexandrovich Fadeyev (1901–1956), Soviet writer
- Alexander Vladimirovich Fadeyev (b. 1964), Soviet and Russian figure skater
- Alexey Fadeyev (b. 1977), Russian Nordic combined athlete
- Ivan Fadeev (1906–1976), Soviet economist and politician
- Maxim Fadeev (b. 1968), Russian musician and music producer
- Oksana Fadeyeva (b. 1975), Russian table tennis player
