= Popowicz =

Popowicz (Polish pronunciation: [pɔˈpɔvit͡ʂ]) is a Polish surname. Notable people include:

- Eugeniusz Popowicz (born 1961), Polish Archbishop-Metropolitan of Ukrainian Catholic Archeparchy of Przemyśl–Warsaw
- Dariusz Popowicz, Acid Drinkers lead guitarist
- Jan Popowicz (born 1948), Polish archer
- Maciej Popowicz (born 1984), Polish creator of nasza-klasa.pl and Ten Square Games
- Marika Popowicz-Drapała (born 1988), Polish track and field athlete

== See also ==
- Popović
