= Traian Popovici =

Romanian lawyer and mayor of Cernăuți (1892–1946)

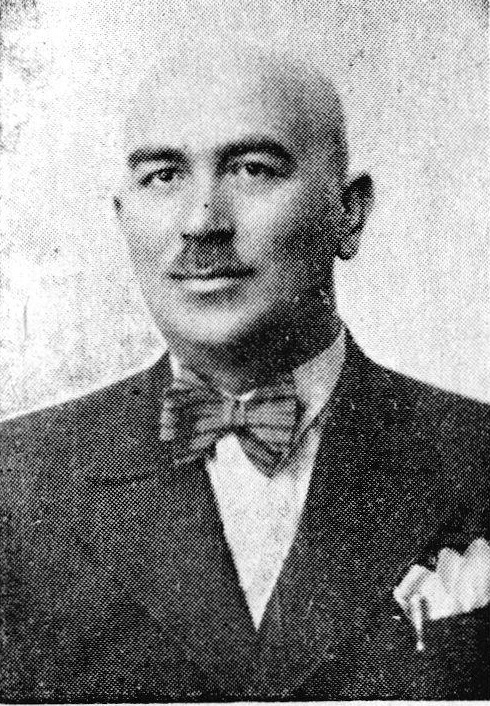
- Traian Popovici, year 1934

Personal details
- Born: 17 October 1892 Rușii Mănăstioarei, Duchy of Bukovina, Austro-Hungarian Empire
- Died: 4 June 1946 (aged 53) Colacu, Suceava County, Kingdom of Romania
- Party: National Christian Party (1935–1938)
- Other political affiliations: National Agrarian Party (before 1935)
- Education: University of Chernowitz
- Occupation: lawyer
- Religion: Romanian Orthodox

Traian Popovici (October 17, 1892 – June 4, 1946) was a Romanian lawyer and mayor of Cernăuți during World War II, known for saving 20,000 Jews of Bukovina from deportation.

== Life ==
Popovici was born in Rușii Mănăstioarei village of the Duchy of Bukovina in the Austro-Hungarian Empire. He was the son of Andrei Popovich of Udești and grandson of Ioan Popovich, a famous priest, who, in 1777, refused to take the oath to the Austrian Empire. His uncle was Dorimedont Popovici (1873–1950), who became a minister for Bucovina under the government led by General Alexandru Averescu.

He studied at the Suceava high school (1903–1911), then enrolled at the Faculty of Law of the University of Chernowitz, which he graduated at the end of World War I. He was a former president of Societatea Academică Junimea. In 1908, while a high school student, he crossed from Austria-Hungary into Romania illegally, in order to see Nicolae Iorga who was visiting the town of Burdujeni. When World War I started, he went to Romania and enlisted in the Romanian Army, fighting until the end of the war. After World War I, he settled briefly in Chișinău, where he was secretary at "Our House" organization that dealt with land reform.

In the interwar period, he worked as a lawyer in the city of Cernăuți. He was the head of the Câmpulung Moldovenesc branch of the National Agrarian Party. In 1935, he was the founder of the Cernăuți branch of the far-right National Christian Party. After the Soviet occupation of Northern Bukovina in June 1940, he took refuge in Bucharest, where he continued to work as a lawyer.

== Mayor of Cernăuți ==
In June 1941, Romania entered World War II on the side of the Axis and soon after re-established control over Bessarabia and Northern Bukovina. Military dictator Ion Antonescu requested him to become mayor of Cernăuți, but Popovici initially refused, unwilling to serve a fascist government. He changed his mind, however, based on advice from his friends. A few days after acceptance, in early August 1941, he was ordered by Alexandru Rioșanu, the Governor-General of Bukovina, to create a ghetto for the Jews of Cernăuți, but Popovici refused to accept that part of the city's population could be confined behind barbed wire fences.

On August 30, 1941, Rioșanu died after an unsuccessful surgery, and he was succeeded as governor by General Corneliu Calotescu. On October 10, Calotescu announced his decision that all the Jews of Cernăuți must be deported to Transnistria. After a long debate, Calotescu allowed Popovici to nominate 200 Jews who were to be exempted from deportation. Unsatisfied with the modest concession, Popovici tried reaching Antonescu himself, this time arguing that Jews were of capital importance to Cernăuți's economy and requested a postponement until replacements could be found. As a result, he was allowed to expand the list, which covered 20,000 Jews in its final version.

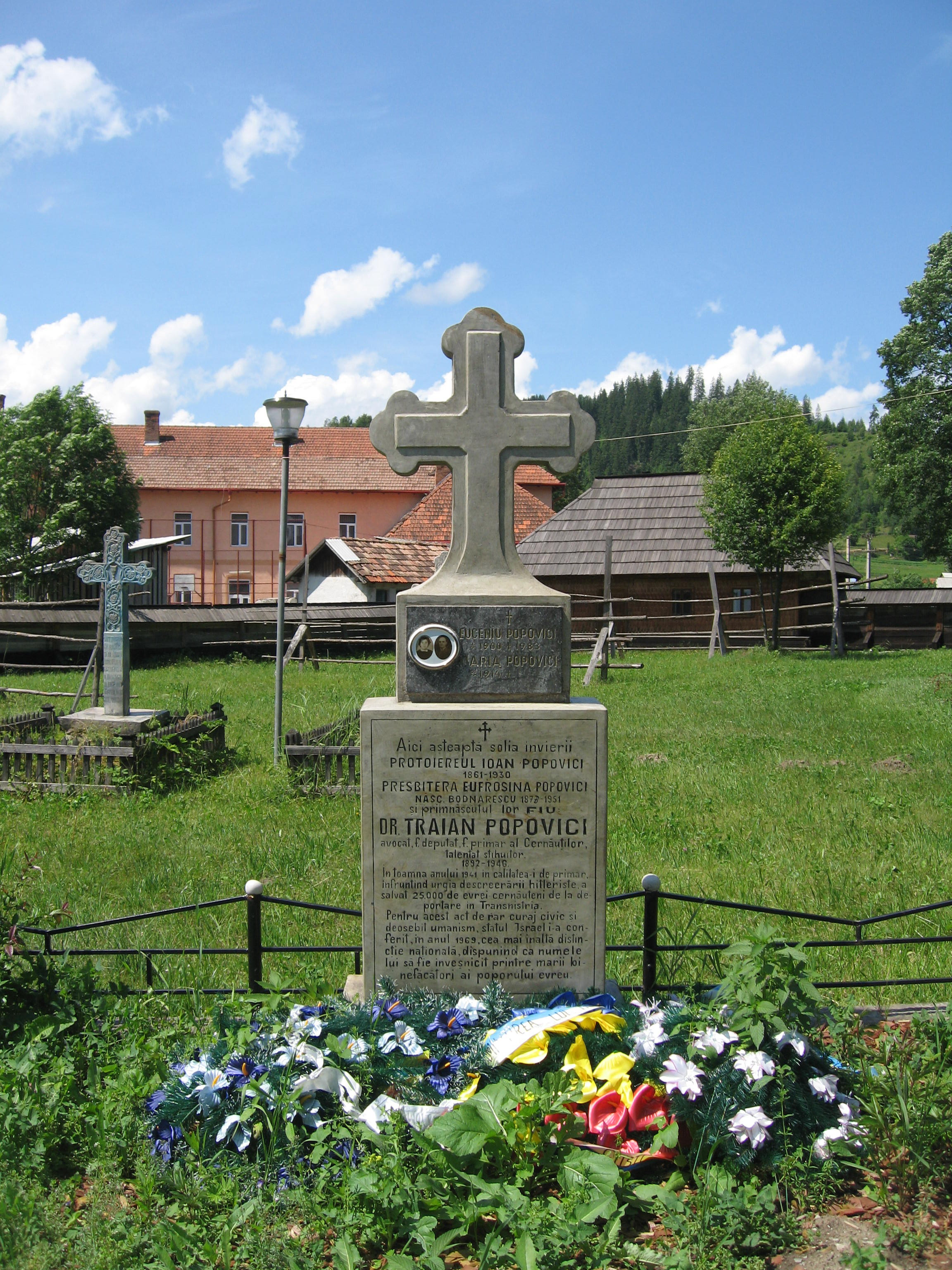
Grave of Popovici in Colacu

Popovici died in 1946 in the village of Colacu (part of Fundu Moldovei commune, in Suceava County), and was buried in the churchyard of the village, next to the Colacu Wooden Church.

Due to Popovici's defense of Jews, his political adversaries nicknamed him "jidovitul" ("the turned-Jewish").

== Legacy ==
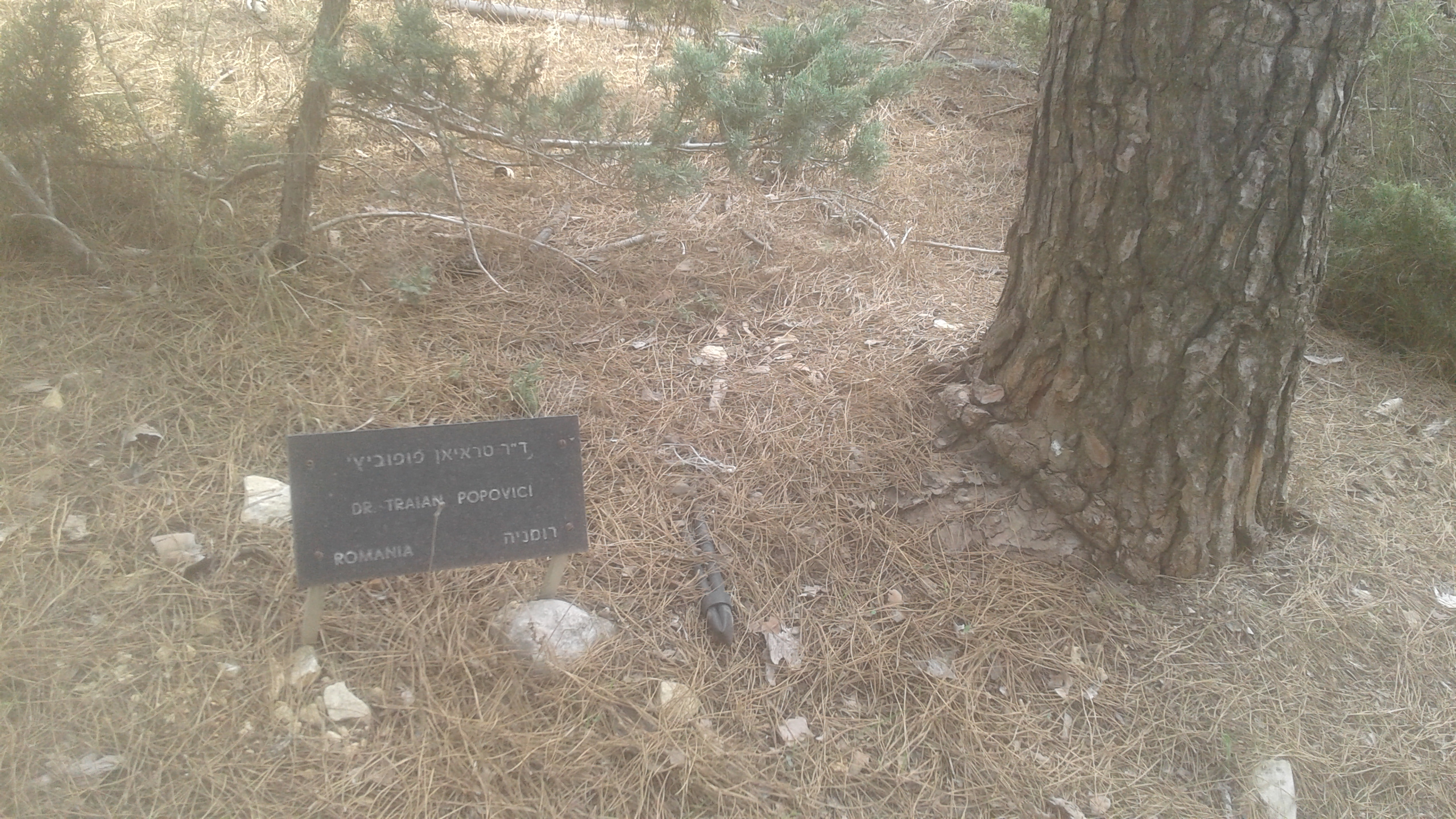
Traian Popovici Righteous Among the Nations tree and plaque at Yad Vashem

Popovici is honored by Israel's Yad Vashem memorial as one of the Righteous Among the Nations, an honour given to non-Jews who behaved with heroism in trying to save Jews from the genocide of the Holocaust.

== See also ==
- List of people who helped Jews during the Holocaust
