= Raspopović =

Raspopović (Serbian Cyrillic: Распоповић) is a Montenegrin surname, derived from raspop ("ex-priest"). It may refer to:

- Savo Raspopović, Montenegrin guerilla militia leader
- Milan Raspopović, Serbian professor
- Nikola Raspopović (born 1989), Serbian footballer
- Momčilo Raspopović, Montenegrin footballer

== See also ==
- Raspopov
