= Aleksandar Popović =

Aleksandar Popović may refer to:

- Aleksandar Popović (sprinter) (born 1957), Yugoslav Olympic sprinter
- Aleksandar Popović (politician) (born 1971), Yugoslav sprinter, Serbian politician
- Aleksandar Popović (writer) (1929–1996), Serbian playwright
- Aleksandar Popović (footballer, born 1983), Austrian-born Serbian football player
- Aleksandar Popović (footballer, born 1999), Serbian football goalkeeper
- Aleksandar Popović (1950s tennis player), Yugoslavian Davis Cup tennis player
- Aleksandar Popović (1920s tennis player), Yugoslavian Davis Cup tennis player

== See also ==
- Saša Popović (1954–2025), Serbian musician and television presenter
