= Yevgeni Popov =

Yevgeni Popov may refer to:

- Yevgeni Anatolyevich Popov (born 1946), Russian writer
- Yevgeni Sergeyevich Popov (born 1977), Russian bobsledder
- Yevgeny Popov (journalist) (born 1978), Russian journalist and politician
- Yevgeni Popov (cyclist) (born 1984), Russian cyclist
- Yevgeni Popov (footballer) (born 1988), Russian footballer
