= Aleksei Popov (footballer, born 1990) =

Russian footballer

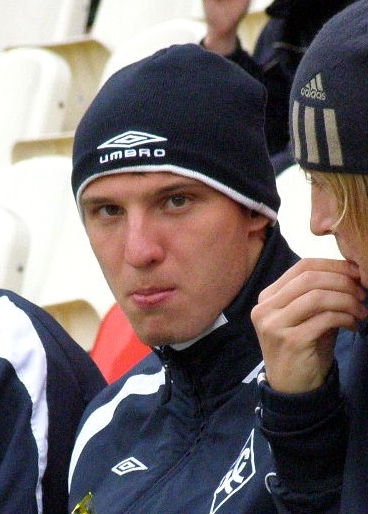
- Popov as a player of FC Krylya Sovetov Samara

Personal information
- Full name: Aleksei Arkadyevich Popov
- Date of birth: 8 July 1990 (age 36)
- Height: 1.73 m (5 ft 8 in)
- Position: Forward

Youth career
- Chkalovets-Olimpik

Senior career*
Years	Team	Apps	(Gls)
2005–2006	Chkalovets-Olimpik		
2008–2011	Krylia Sovetov Samara	1	(0)
2010	→ Dnepr Smolensk (loan)	28	(8)
2012	FC Sibir-Zarya-M Novosibirsk		
2013	Spartak Kostroma	17	(3)
2014	Vologda	9	(1)
- * Club domestic league appearances and goals

Aleksei Arkadyevich Popov (Russian: Алексей Аркадьевич Попов; born 8 July 1990) is a former Russian professional football player.

== Club career ==
He made his Russian Premier League debut for FC Krylia Sovetov Samara on 13 March 2010 in a game against FC Zenit St. Petersburg.
