= Popov Manor House =

- Садиба Попова (Ukrainian)
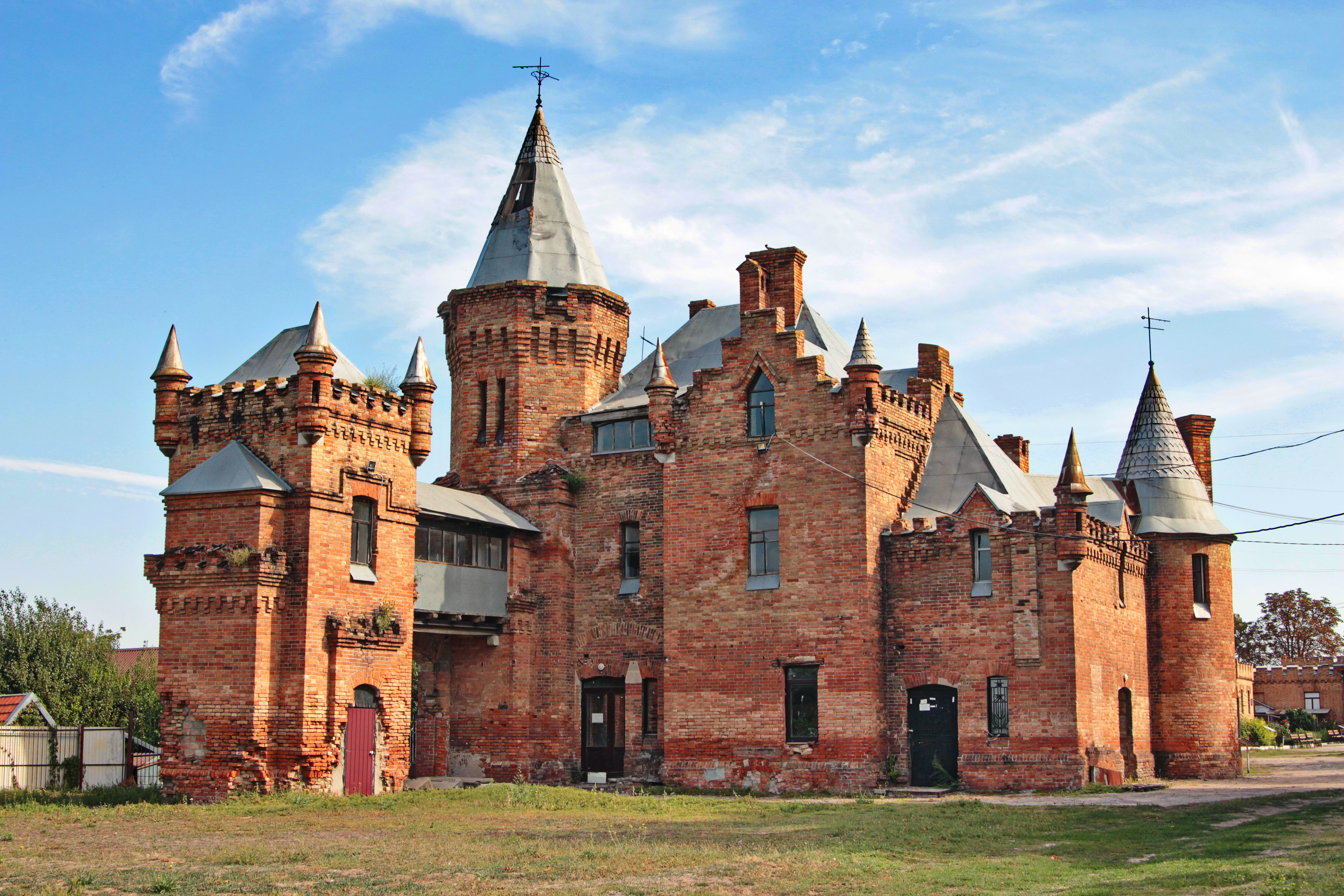
- Western wing

- Location within Ukraine
- 47°26′45″N 35°16′30″E
- Type: Manor house
- Location: Vasylivka, Zaporizhzhia Oblast

History
- Founder: Vasiliy Popov
- Built: 1864–1884
- Original use: Family manor house

Site notes
- Area: 2.87 ha (7.1 acres)
- Architect: not established
- Architectural styles: Moorish architecture, Gothic Revival architecture, others
- Current use: Historical museum
- Governing body: Vasylivka Historical and Architectural Museum-Reserve
- Owner: Government of Ukraine

The Vasylivka Historical and Architectural Museum-Reserve "Popov Manor House" (Ukrainian: Василівський історико-архітектурний музей-заповідник «Садиба Попова», romanized: Vasylivskyi istoryko-arkhitekturnyi muzei-zapovidnyk "Sadyba Popova", also known as Vasylivka Castle) is an established museum complex at a partly preserved manor house built between 1864 and 1884 near the town of Vasylivka, Ukraine by Vasili Popov Jr. (a grandson of General Vasili Stepanovich Popov).

The Historic and Cultural Reserve was created on 29 January 1993 in place of the existing Vasylivka museum of local history.

== Manor House ==
Its Gothic Revival design is attributed to Nicholas Benois. The main house had a telescope, a picture gallery, and an ethnographic museum. The castle was looted by the Bolsheviks and ruined by the Germans in the Second World War. Restoration works did not start until the 1990s.

== Shelling and robbery of the estate ==
On 7 March 2022, during the military invasion of Ukraine, the Popov Manor was fired upon by Russian troops. The arena-stable building of the Popov manor was damaged.

On 13 March 2022, the museum was looted by the Russian military. In addition to the robbery, they damaged the premises, broke the windows and broke all the doors.

On 19 April 2023, it was reported that the Russians began to remove property from the manor.

== Owners of the Popovy estate ==
The lands near the future city of Oleksandrivsk were donated by Empress Catherine II to General Vasyl Popov. He became the founder of the settlement that later became the town of Vasylivka. Previously, the area was used for Cossack winter quarters and had several farms.

The general's grandson, Vasyl Popov, started a large-scale construction project in the second half of the 19th century. The Popov family owned the estate until the October Revolution of 1917.

== Construction of the estate ==
It is not possible to identify the project's founder. Most likely, there were several of them, which causes problems for researchers. One of the possible architects is a local architect, Oleksandr Ageienko. According to stylistic features, one of the architects could have been Benoit Nikolai Leontievich from St. Petersburg (1813–1898). The construction of the manor lasted 20 years (1864–1884), and it became the largest among the manors of Eastern Ukraine. Built in the historical styles of the 19th century, the castle has features of the Northern Italian Renaissance, Gothic and Moorish features. The buildings are constructed of red brick from Popov's own factories in Vasylivka.

V. S. Popov was the manager of the office for the construction of royal houses and gardens. At a certain period, in the midst of career ups and downs, the count left the service due to health problems and began to arrange his estates. Popov had many of them: in the Yekaterinoslav, Kherson, Tavriya, Minsk provinces, and in the Urals.

== The estate, description of the ruined building ==
The main building of the palace and park complex is the castle. The technical design was created by architect Stunkle. The castle was built of brick, two-story, in its original form, and had five towers, three of which had tent roofs. The building measured 42 by 45 m (138 by 148 ft), with foundations that housed wine cellars. The castle had baths (Finnish, Roman, etc.), a ballroom, living rooms, an art gallery, a library, and a collection of ancient weapons. In 1907, an ethnographic museum was organized, where exhibits of 15 different national cultures were presented. At the beginning of the 20th century, the estate was equipped with a meteorological and power station. The meteorological station of the Popov estate was included in the network of meteorological services of the Russian Empire. An astronomical observatory with a telescope was also arranged on the roof of the estate. The terrace with the telescope was decorated with sculptures by the Italian master Langobardi. In addition to the main house, the estate had stables, office premises, a landscape park, and fountains.

== The castle during the Soviet era ==
The October Revolution and the First World War prompted the owner of the estate, Yurii Popov, to save the property. According to legend, he managed to take out some of the most valuable items. The library's books, furniture, ethnographic collections, paintings, and sculptures were looted or destroyed. The castle, the park, and the surrounding oak tree, which was cut down for firewood, suffered the greatest losses. Until the beginning of the Second World War, the buildings of the estate housed a pigsty.

In 1934, part of the estate's buildings were dismantled for construction of a local cultural center. The wooden vaults and ceilings and partially the roofs were broken out. In 1954, by the decision of the Soviet authorities, the Cathedral of St. Peter and Paul, also built by the Popov family in Vasylivka, was destroyed. Later, a school for mentally ill children was located in the stables of the estate. The carriage barn was added to the second floor, and a dormitory for a local technical school was built on the vacated territory. The complex was partially destroyed and the building materials were stolen by local residents.

== Gallery ==
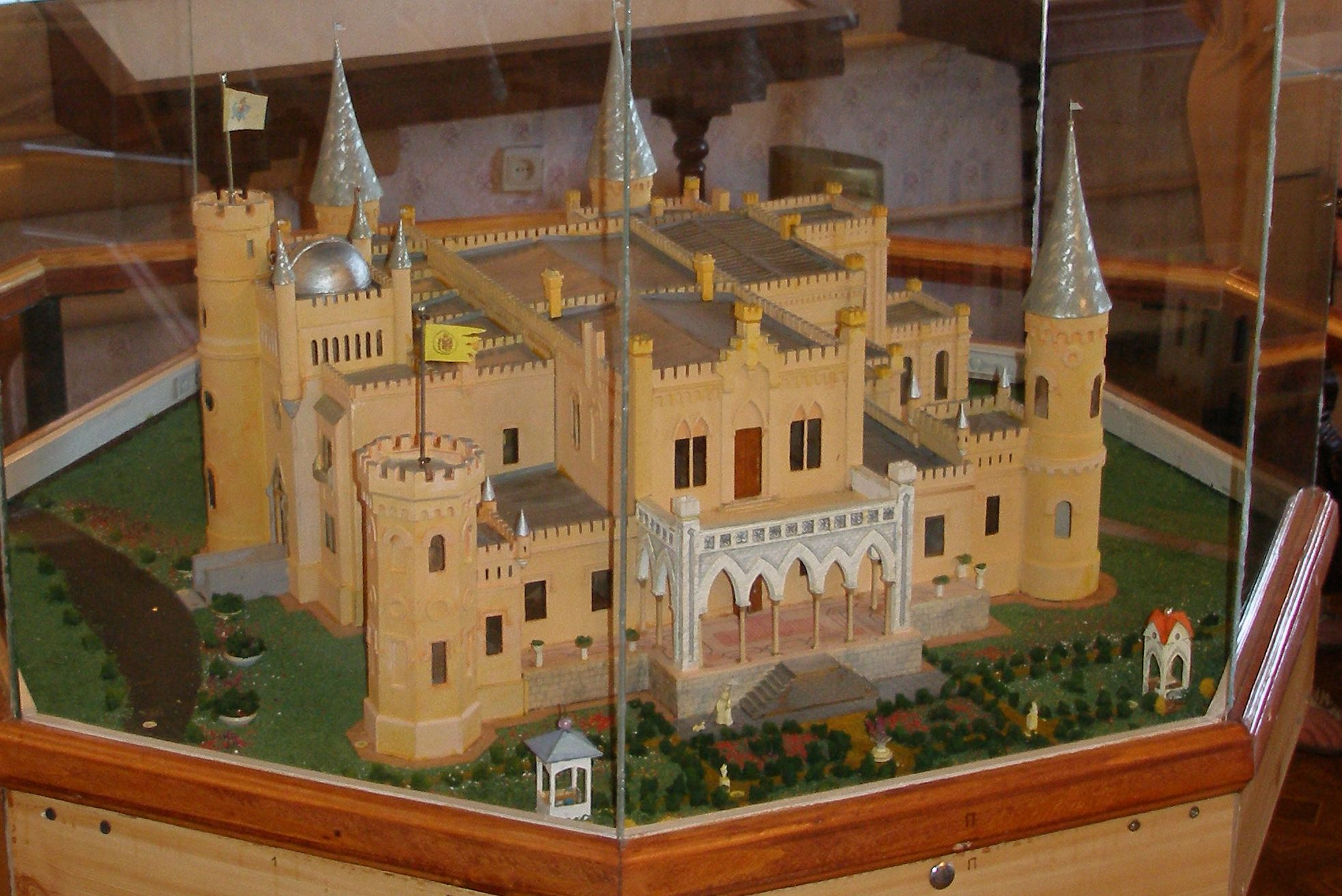
Reconstructed model

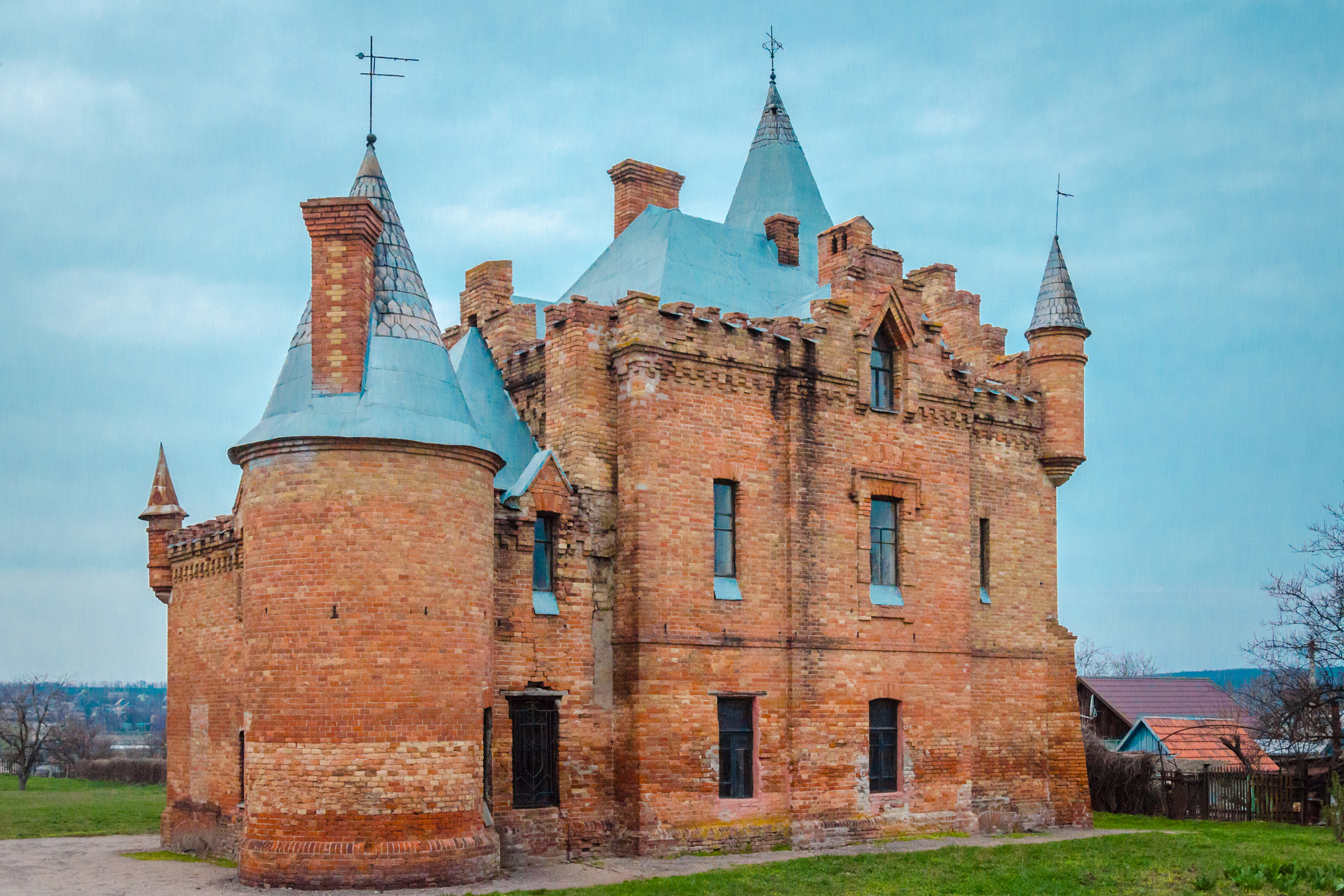
Western wing

Eastern wing

Northern wing

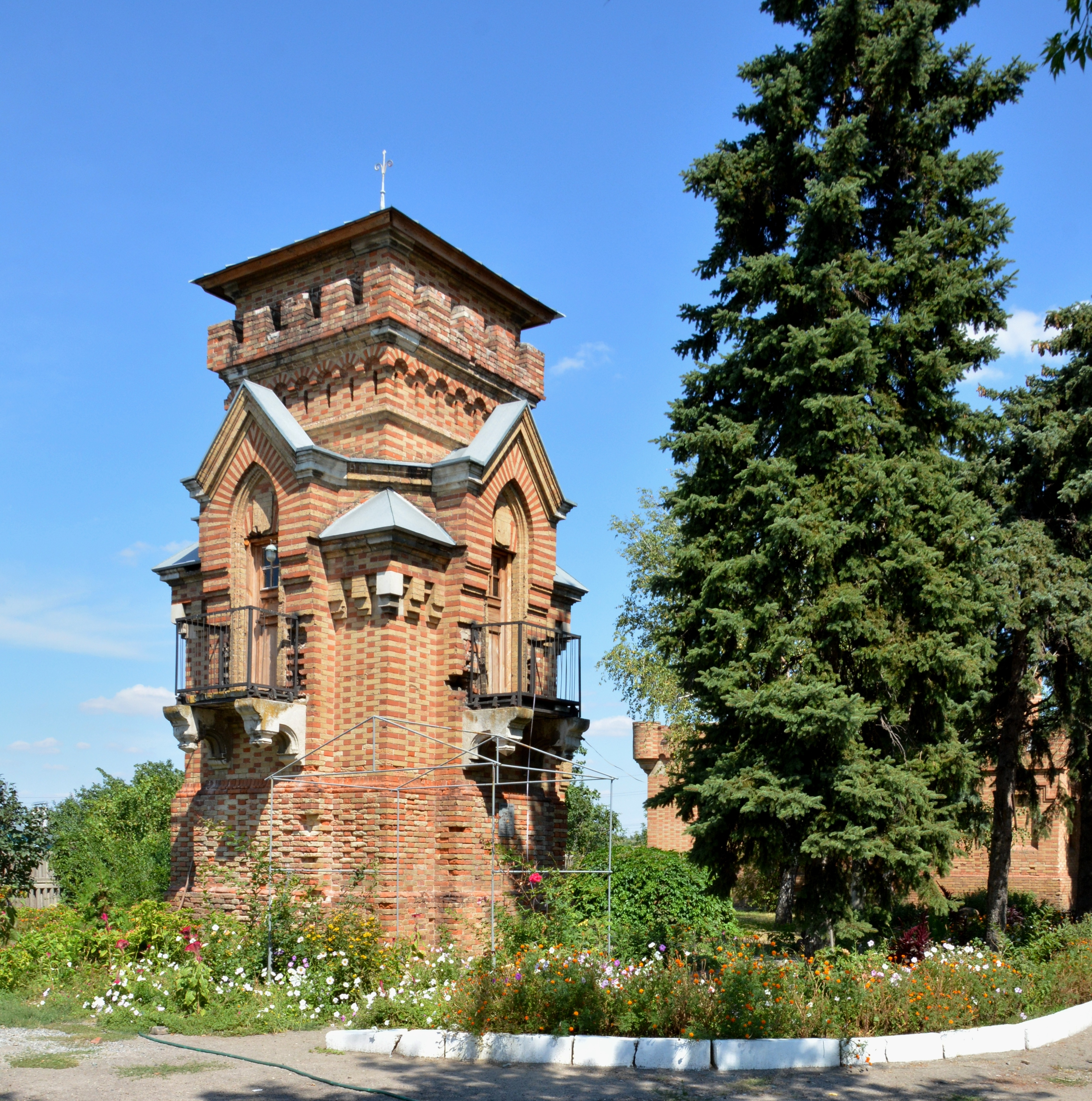
Spotting tower

Coach house

Stables

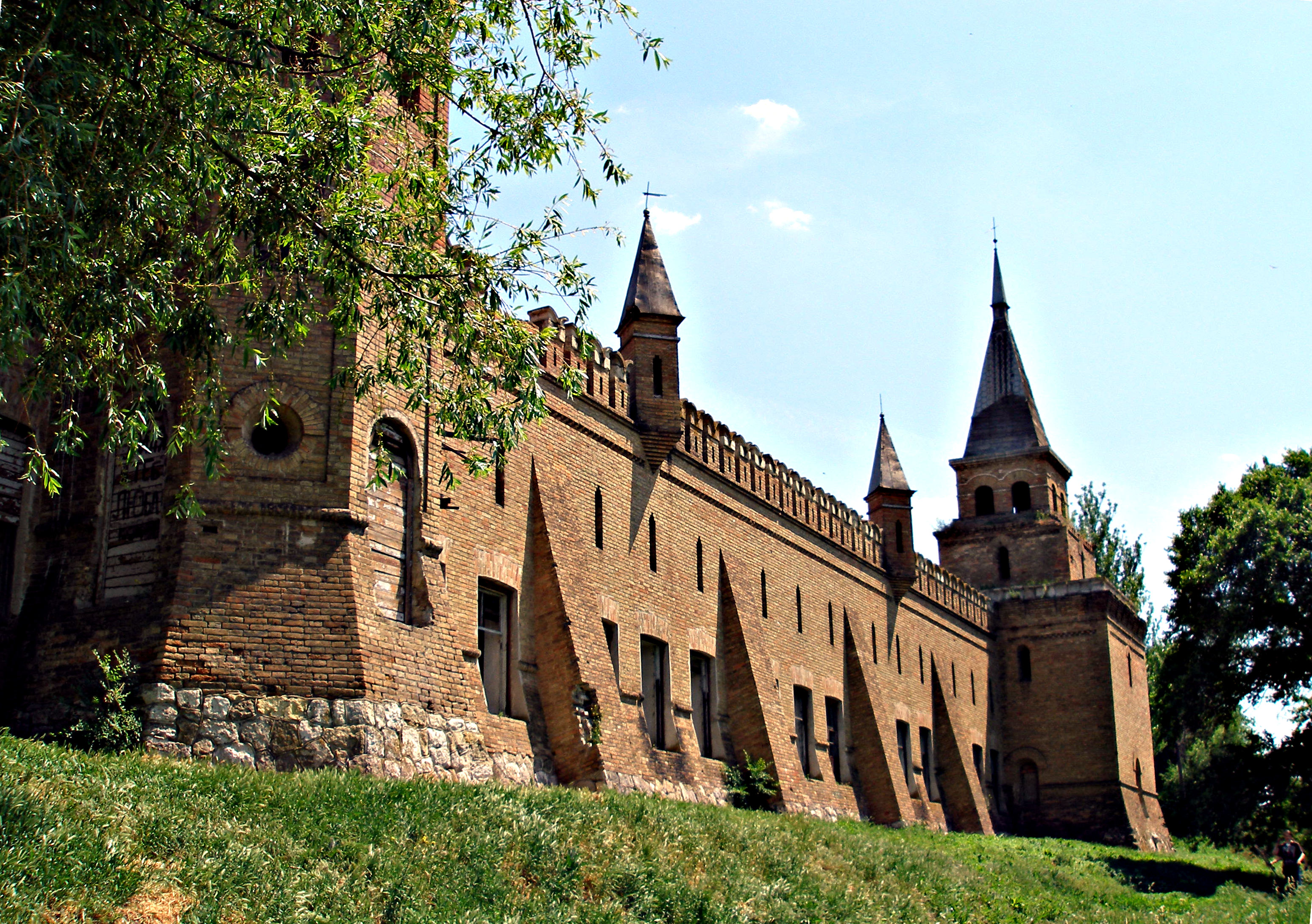
Rear wall

The only surviving tower of the main building

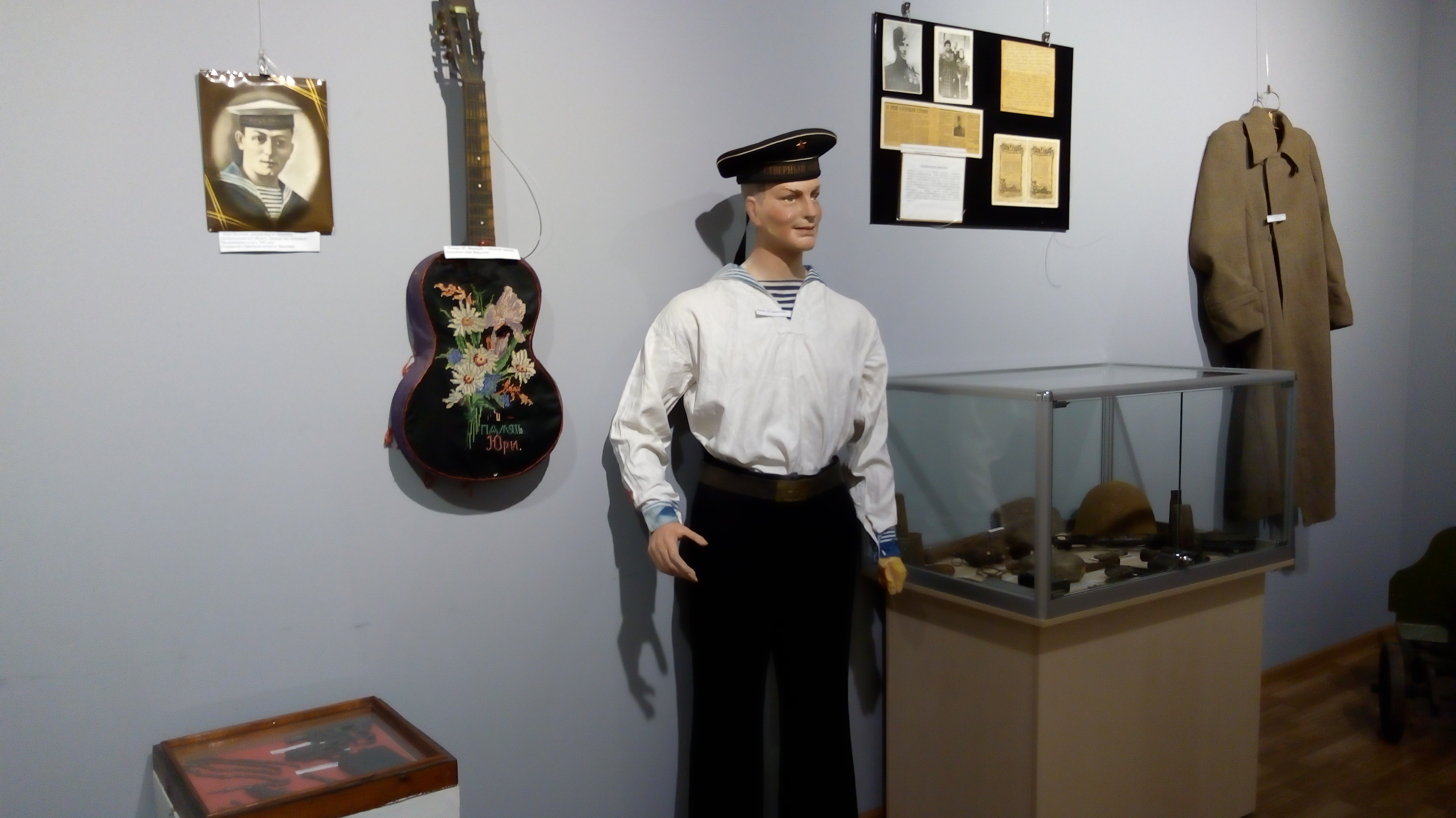
A display commemorating local sailor Yuriy Monosov of the Northern Fleet

== See also ==
- List of historic reserves in Ukraine
