= Aleksandr Popov (volleyball coach) =

Bulgarian volleyball player and coach

Alexander Popov
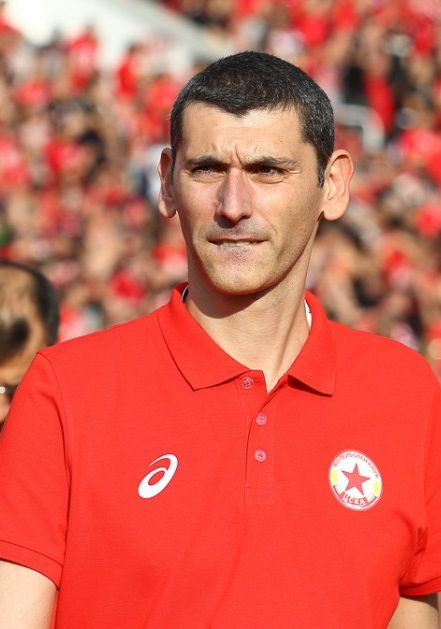

Personal information
- Nickname: Sasho
- Nationality: Bulgarian
- Born: 9 June 1972 (age 54); Sofia, Bulgaria

Alexander Popov (in Bulgarian: Александър Попов, born 9 june 1972 in Sofia) is former Bulgarian volleyball player, CEO and head coach of the men's team of VC CSKA Sofia from 1997.
