= Popovski =

Popovski (Macedonian: Поповски), feminine:Popovska is a Macedonian surname that may refer to:

- Aleksandar Popovski- Macedonian football defender.
- Aleksandra Popovska
- Elena Popovska
- Lazar Popovski- (b. 1975) Macedonian kayaker.
- Zivko Popovski- (1934–2007) Macedonian architect.
- Zoran T. Popovski- Macedonian scientist.

== See also ==
- Popovsky
