= Vasili Stepanovich Popov =

Russian general (1743–1822)

Vasili Popov - Popowski
- Василий Попов
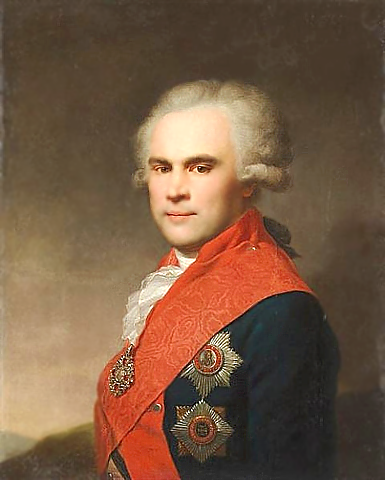
- Portrait by Johann Baptist von Lampi the Elder

President of the Collegium of State Income
- In office 1797–1799
- Monarch: Paul I
- Preceded by: Mikhail Shcherbatov
- Succeeded by: Alexey Kozhin

Personal details
- Born: 1743 Kazan Governorate
- Died: 5 November 1822 (aged 78–79) Saint Petersburg
- Resting place: Alexander Nevsky Lavra

Military service
- Allegiance: Russian Empire
- Years of service: 1767–1796
- Rank: Lieutenant general

Vasili Stepanovich Popov - Popowski (Russian: Василий Степанович Попов, Polish: Bazyli Popowski; 1743–1822) was an Imperial Russian general and statesman who presided over the office of Prince Potemkin.

Bazyli Popowski vel Vasili Popov was born in the Polish noble family of the Pobóg coat of arms.

The father of Bazyli Popowski was Szczepan Popowski, a state official in Kazan.

Szczepan Popowski was born in the family estate of Popovo - Kuligóv (Polish: Popowo - Kuligowo), today Popowo-Parcele in Poland in Mazovia.

The owner of the Popovo - Kuligov estate was Aleksander Popowski, father of Szczepan Popowski.

In 1792 Popov advised Empress Catherine II of Russia on Polish affairs. It was he who authored the Targowicka Confederation founding act. Emperor Paul appointed him senator. Popov had large estates in Ukraine, where the town of Vasylivka bears his name. It was his grandson who built Popov Castle there.
