= Dmitry Yakovlevich Popov =

Dmitry Popov Russian: Дмитрий Попов
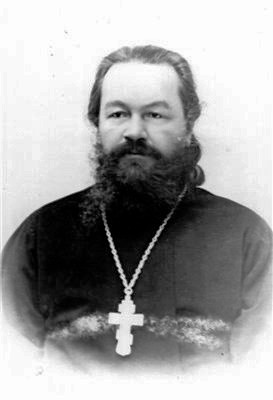
- photo of 1902

Deputy of the Fourth Imperial Duma
- In office 20 November 1912 – 6 October 1917
- Monarch: Nicholas II / monarchy abolished
- Succeeded by: post abolished

Personal details
- Born: Dmitry Yakovlevich Popov; 3 May 1863 Vologda Governorate, Russian Empire
- Died: 9 October 1921 (aged 58) Komi-Zyryan Autonomous Oblast, RSFSR
- Party: Progressive Party; Socialist Revolutionary Party (1918)

Dmitry Yakovlevich Popov (pseudonyms — D. Punimov and D. Ya. Podov, Russian: Дми́трий Я́ковлевич Попо́в; May 3, 1863, Vologda Governorate — October 9, 1921, Komi-Zyryan Autonomous Oblast) was a priest and revolutionary, who was expelled from the seminary because of his alcoholism. Later he became a head of a parochial school and a censor of translations from Komi language - he also wrote poems in this language. Popov was a deputy of the Fourth Imperial Duma from the Vologda Governorate between 1912 and 1917. During the February Revolution, he blessed revolutionary troops in front of Tauride Palace. After October 1917, he supported the bolsheviks, for which he was laicization of clergy. Later he became a member of the Komi-autonomist party and was accused of anti-Soviet activities.

== Literature ==
- Николаев А. Б. Попов Дмитрий Яковлевич (in Russian) // Государственная дума Российской империи: 1906—1917 / Б. Ю. Иванов, А. А. Комзолова, И. С. Ряховская. — Москва: РОССПЭН, 2008. — P. 482. — 735 p. — ISBN 978-5-8243-1031-3.
- Попов (in Russian) // Члены Государственной думы (портреты и биографии): Четвертый созыв, 1912—1917 г. / сост. М. М. Боиович. — Москва: Тип. Т-ва И. Д. Сытина, 1913. — P. 39. — LXIV, 454, [2] p.
- Демин В. Дмитрий Яковлевич Попов, общественный деятель и поэт (in Russian) // Писатели Коми: Библиографический словарь. — Сыктывкар: Научная библиотека Республики Коми; Коми научный центр УрО РАН; Литературно-мемориальный музей И. Куратова, 2001. — Vol. 2. — P. 134. — 510 p. — ISBN 5-7934-0007-9.
