= House of Popkov =

- Дом Пoпкова
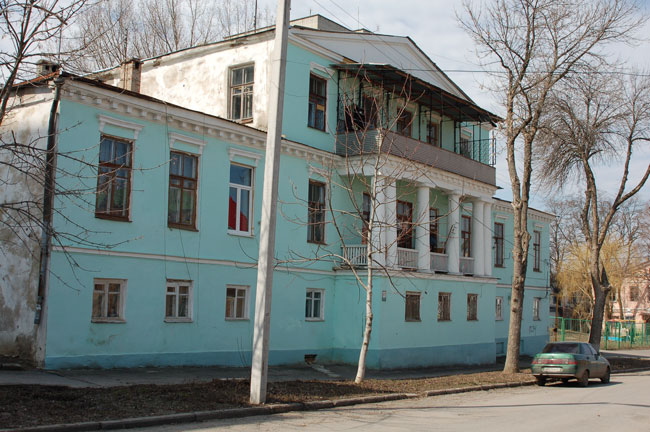
- 47°07′54″N 39°25′21″E

The House of Popkov (Russian: Дом Пoпкова) is a mansion of the beginning of the 19th century in the center of Taganrog located at the address by Schmidt Street, 17.

== Description ==
The composition of the building is simple. The facade is symmetric, decorated with six smooth columns of the Doric warrant supporting a triangular pediment. In the bottom of a column connect balustrades. On the ground (economic) floor of a window are executed square shape. Rectangular windows of the second and second stores are decorated with Sandra. On all perimeter of the second floor there pass the continuous eaves with rectangular order croutons (identical). As a result of a mezzanine superstructure in 1828 the triangular pediment was lifted on the floor above. After reconstruction the colonnade perceives loading from a wide balcony of the second stores making an impression of an attic.

Dmitry Zinkovsky about the house shot the documentary.

== History ==
The building is built in 1808 in style of the Russian provincial classicism. The house served as private possession of the city's mayor of Taganrog P. A. Papkov. After its departure from Taganrog, the house became profitable. From 1847 to 1856 here with daughters the widow Ya. G. Morozova, suddenly died Papkov's partner lived. One of her daughters – Evgenia – became A. P. Chekhov's mother subsequently.

After Papkov the house devolved to his niece, baroness Fitingof, and already from her, the household passed to the major general A. G. Remy, the landowner after resignation. In 1840–41 on the way to the Caucasus Papkov's house was visited by the colleague Remy M. Yu. Lermontov. From 1890th years the building belonged to Remy's spouse, Maria, since the beginning of the 20th century of her daughter, Ekaterina, and her brother, Nikolay Aleksandrovich, the owner of the house became before the most October Revolution.

In the 1900s, Remy's successors began to lease the household to a city and public institutions. Originally here management of the military administration, then since 1910 District committee on a room allowance of troops, District printing house, management of the District chief of the Taganrog district was placed. In 1914 because of the begun World War I the house was donated under sanatorium for wounded. In a Soviet period in the building, there were communal flats. Since 1976 Papkov's house is an object of cultural heritage of local value.
