= Sergei Popov (footballer) =

Russian footballer

Personal information
- Full name: Sergei Igorevich Popov
- Date of birth: 22 February 1987 (age 39)
- Height: 1.79 m (5 ft 10 1/2 in)
- Position: Defender

Youth career
- FC Shinnik Yaroslavl

Senior career*
Years	Team	Apps	(Gls)
2004–2006	FC Shinnik Yaroslavl	0	(0)
2007	FC Shinnik-2-Vodokanal Yaroslavl		
2008	FC Shinnik Yaroslavl	0	(0)
2009–2012	FC Dynamo Vologda	60	(0)
2012–2014	FC Dynamo Vologda (amateur)		
- * Club domestic league appearances and goals

Sergei Igorevich Popov (Russian: Серге́й Игоревич Попов; born 22 February 1987) is a former Russian professional football player.

== Club career ==
He made his debut for FC Shinnik Yaroslavl on 2 July 2006 in a Russian Cup against FC Dynamo Bryansk.
