= Valery Popov =

Valery Popov may refer to:

- Valery Popov (diplomat), Soviet and Russian diplomat and ambassador
- Valery Popov (writer), Soviet and Russian writer
- Valery Popov (musician), Soviet bassoonist
- Valerij Popov, Russian chess player
