= Popovskaya, Totemsky District, Vologda Oblast =

Popovskaya Поповская
- Village
- Location within Vologda Oblast Location within Russia
- Coordinates: 59°24′N 42°46′E
- Country: Russia
- Region: Vologda Oblast
- District: Totemsky District
- Time zone: UTC+3:00

Popovskaya (Russian: Поповская) is a rural locality (a village) in Tolshmenskoye Rural Settlement, Totemsky District, Vologda Oblast, Russia. The population was 6 as of 2002.

== Geography ==
Popovskaya is located 99 km south of Totma (the district's administrative centre) by road. Uspenye is the nearest rural locality.
