= Ilya Popov (basketball) =

Russian basketball player (born 1995)

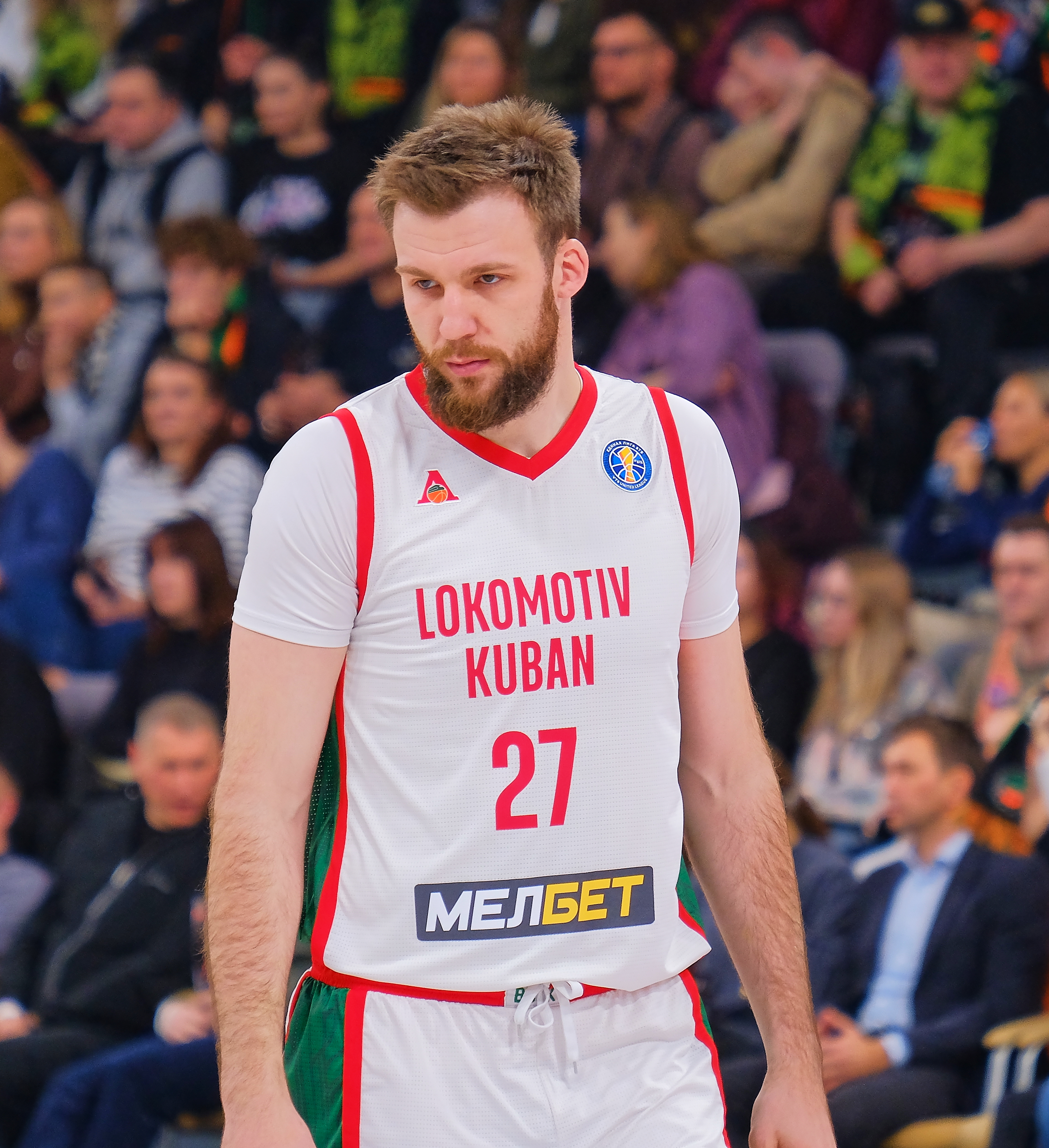
- Popov in 2025

No. 27 – PBC Lokomotiv Kuban
- Position: Center
- League: VTB United

Personal information
- Born: April 4, 1995 (age 31) St. Petersburg, Russia
- Listed height: 210 cm (6 ft 11 in)

Career history
- 2015–2016: BC Spartak Primorye
- 2017–2019: BC Nizhny Novgorod
- 2019: BC Enisey

Ilya Dmitrievich Popov (Russian: Попов, Илья Дмитриевич; April 4, 1995) is a Russian professional basketball player.

== Career ==
Popov got his professional start in BC Spartak Saint Petersburg, and has been in the club's system since he was 15 years old. In 2014, after the club lost its professional status, he moved to Nizhny Novgorod.

In January 2015, he went on loan for the rest of the season to BC Spartak Primorye. During his time there, he won a bronze medal at the 2014–15 Russian Basketball Cup, and won a silver medal at the 2014–15 Russian Basketball Super League 1. In February 2017, he signed a three-year contract with Nizhny Novgorod.

In the 2018-2019 season, Popov played in 14 games in the VTB United League, averaging 7.1 points, 2.2 rebounds, and 0.6 assists per game. In the FIBA Champions League, he averaged 4 points, 3.3 rebounds, and 1 assist over 14 games. In February 2019, he and his club mutually agreed to a premature termination of his contract.

He continued his career with BC Enisey, and at the end of the season, he received an invitation from Lions de Genève, who needed reinforcements ahead of playoffs. In the Swiss Championship finals, the team lost three times to Fribourg Olympic Basket and finished as the runner-up in the tournament.

In the 2019-2020 season, he played 18 games in VTB, averaging 4.8 points, 1.9 rebounds, and 0.7 assists per game. He played in 12 FIBA games, averaging 7 points, 3.3 rebounds, and 1.2 assists. In July 2020, he signed a new contract with Enisey.

In June 2021, Popov transferred to BC Runa, winning a silver medal in that year's Super League championship, a bronze medal in the Russian Cup, and was named as "Best Center" in the All-Tournament team. In the 2022-2023 season, he won the silver medal at the Super League for the third time. He extended his contract with BC Runa in June 2023. The following year, he joined BC Samara.

In January 2025, Popov was selected by fan vote to participate in the VTB United League All-Star Game 2025. In said game, he played for 7 minutes and 45 seconds, ending with 7 points and 3 rebounds. He left Samara in February 2025, transferring to BC Uralmash Yekaterinburg, with his team winning that year's Russian Basketball Cup.

On April 13, 2025, in a game against PBC Lokomotiv Kuban (95-91), Popov set a career record for points (26), and became the 10th player in the history of the league and the first Russian to make 10 or more field goals without a single miss. In July of that year, he joined Lokomotiv-Kuban.

=== National team ===
In 2013, as part of the Russian youth team, Popov placed 8th at the European Basketball Championship (U18). In 2015, he participated in the European U20 held in Italy, placing 16th.

In 2019, he was included in the reserve list of Russians to participate in the 2019 FIBA Basketball World Cup qualifiers. In June, he was invited to an open training camp for the Russian national team.

== Personal life ==
On May 19, 2017, Popov was wed in St. Petersburg to his then-girlfriend Marina.
