= Vladimir Popov (footballer) =

Russian footballer

Personal information
- Full name: Vladimir Aleksandrovich Popov
- Date of birth: 14 October 1978 (age 48)
- Place of birth: Moscow, Russian SFSR
- Height: 1.81 m (5 ft 11 1/2 in)
- Position: Defender

Youth career
- DYuSSh Dynamo-3 Moscow

Senior career*
Years	Team	Apps	(Gls)
1996–1997	FC Chertanovo Moscow (amateur)		
1998	FC Zvezda Shchyolkovo		
1999	FC Titan Zheleznodorozhny	32	(4)
2000–2001	FC Saturn Ramenskoye	3	(0)
2000	→ FC Saturn-d Ramenskoye (loan)	19	(2)
2001	FC Kosmos Elektrostal	18	(1)
2002	FC Metallurg Krasnoyarsk	12	(0)
2004	FC Shakhter Karagandy	9	(0)
2004–2013	FC Oka Stupino (amateur)		
2014	FC Chertanovo-M Moscow		
- * Club domestic league appearances and goals

Vladimir Aleksandrovich Popov (Russian: Владимир Александрович Попов; born 14 October 1978) is a former Russian football player.

== Club career ==
He made his Russian Premier League debut for FC Saturn Ramenskoye on 5 May 2001 in a game against FC Rotor Volgograd.
