= Milan Popović =

Milan Popović may refer to:

- Milan N. Popović (1924–2012), Serbian psychiatrist-psychoanalyst
- Milan Popović (born 1955), a.k.a. Daniel (Montenegrin singer)
- Milan Popović (handballer) (born 1990), Montenegrin handball player
- Milan B. Popović (born 1976), Serbian poet and journalist
