= Popovsky =

Popovsky Поповский
- Khutor
- Location within Volgograd Oblast Location within Russia
- Coordinates: 50°36′N 42°25′E
- Country: Russia
- Region: Volgograd Oblast
- District: Novoanninsky District
- Time zone: UTC+4:00

Popovsky (Russian: Поповский) is a rural locality (a khutor) in Beryozovskoye Rural Settlement, Novoanninsky District, Volgograd Oblast, Russia. The population was 96 as of 2010. There are 3 streets.

== Geography ==
Popovsky is located on the Panika River, 35 km northwest of Novoanninsky (the district's administrative centre) by road. Bolshoy Dubovsky is the nearest rural locality.
