= Ivan Razgildeev =

Ivan Yefgrafovich Razgildeev
- Иван Евграфович Разгильдеев
- Born: 1811
- Died: 1864 (aged 52–53)
- Occupations: Geologist, mineralogist, mining engineer

Ivan Yefgrafovich Razgildeev (Russian: Иван Евграфович Разгильдеев; 1811–1864) was a Russian geologist, mineralogist, and mining engineer, who worked as an administrator in several of the katorga regimes established in the Trans-Baikal region of the Russian Empire.

== Biography ==
The Razgildeevs were a Baikal Cossack family, originating from the Trans-Baikal region. The head of the family, Anempodist Ivanovich Razgildeev, also known as Aleksandr, had served at Chindant, and then at Aksha as a border commandant with the rank of major. From there he moved to Kyakhta in 1842, and then to Verkhneudinsk, where he was chieftain of the Trans-Baikal Cossack Regiment. His son, Pyotr Razgildeev, served in the army, rising to the rank of general. Anempodist's younger brother, Yevgraf Ivanovich Razgildeev, had four sons, Ivan, Aleksandr, Mikhail and Andrei. They studied at Nerchinsk Mining School and then at the Mountain Cadet Corps in Saint Petersburg. Ivan Razgildeev was born in the village of Tsurukhaytuy in Irkutsk Governorate, now Priargunsk, in 1811. He became the head of the Nerchinsk gold mining operations, gaining a reputation for cruelty. He was later replaced by his brother Mikhail. Of the other brothers, Aleksandr became a prominent architect, while Andrei was a land planner for private gold mining enterprises in the Verkhnevilyuysky and Olyokminsky Districts.

Ivan Razgildeev graduated from the Mountain Cadet Corps in 1830 with a silver medal. He participated in the geological exploration of the Nerchinsky mountain district and discovered the Altangan gold deposits in the Tsagan-Oluysky valley, now part of the modern Borzinsky District. He was manager of the gold mines established along the Kara River from 1850 until 1852, and then the works around Nerchinsk from 1852 to 1856. The mining works used prison labour from inmates exiled to Siberia, termed katorga, with the Kara and Nerchinsk katorgas being particularly infamous examples. During Razgildeev's tenure, round-the-clock mining, and the use of an ore-washing of his own invention, allowed an annual gold production of some 100 pounds. The particularly harsh conditions during this period gave rise to the term "Razgildeevshchina", and an investigation was opened into conditions. Razgildeev was brought to trial in 1855, but was protected by the Governor of East Siberia, Nikolay Muravyov-Amursky, and was acquitted.

== In literature ==
Razgildeev's prominent association with the harshness of prison labour conditions in the mid-nineteenth century entered into later works on the tsarist prison regime by a number of writers, including Vlas Doroshevich, Peter Kropotkin and Pyotr Yakubovich. Yakubovich, in his work In the World of the Outcasts, imagined a fictional ending for Razgildeev, with two convicts recounting how after his cruelty came to light, Razgildeev was "stripped entirely of his titles... [and] positions," and just before this, he was ordered to appear before the tsar. He had never made to the Tsar, however, as a Tartar inmate named Baidaulov recognized him and beat him nearly to death. Razgildeev died from injuries days before reaching the tsar. Kropotkin, who had visited the Nerchinsk operations in the early 1860s while serving as aide-de-camp to the Governor of Transbaikalia, General Boleslar Kazimirovich Kukel, observed in his work In Russian and French Prisons, that "the arbitrary despotism of the directors of prisons had no limits, and the dreadful tales which circulated in Transbaikalia about one of them--Razghildeeff--were fully confirmed." Doroshevich mentioned Razgildeev in his work Sakhalin, based on his visits to the region in the late 1890s, recording inmates making reference to the "Razgildeev regime".
