= Raspopov =

Raspopov (Russian: Распопов, feminine: Raspopova, from Russian: распоп meaning 'defrocked priest', is a Russian surname. It may refer to:

- Andriy Raspopov (born 1978), Ukrainian football player
- Kristina Raspopova, flight attendant on Prigozhin's crashed plane
- Nina Raspopova
- Olga Raspopova
- Vladimir Raspopov (1927–1999), Soviet equestrian

== See also ==
- Raspopović, Serbian
