= St. Alexandra's Church, Rostov-on-Don =

Russian Orthodox church in Rostov-on-Don, Rostov Oblast, Russia

Coordinates: 47.2343°N 39.7434°E

Church of the Saint Queen Alexandra
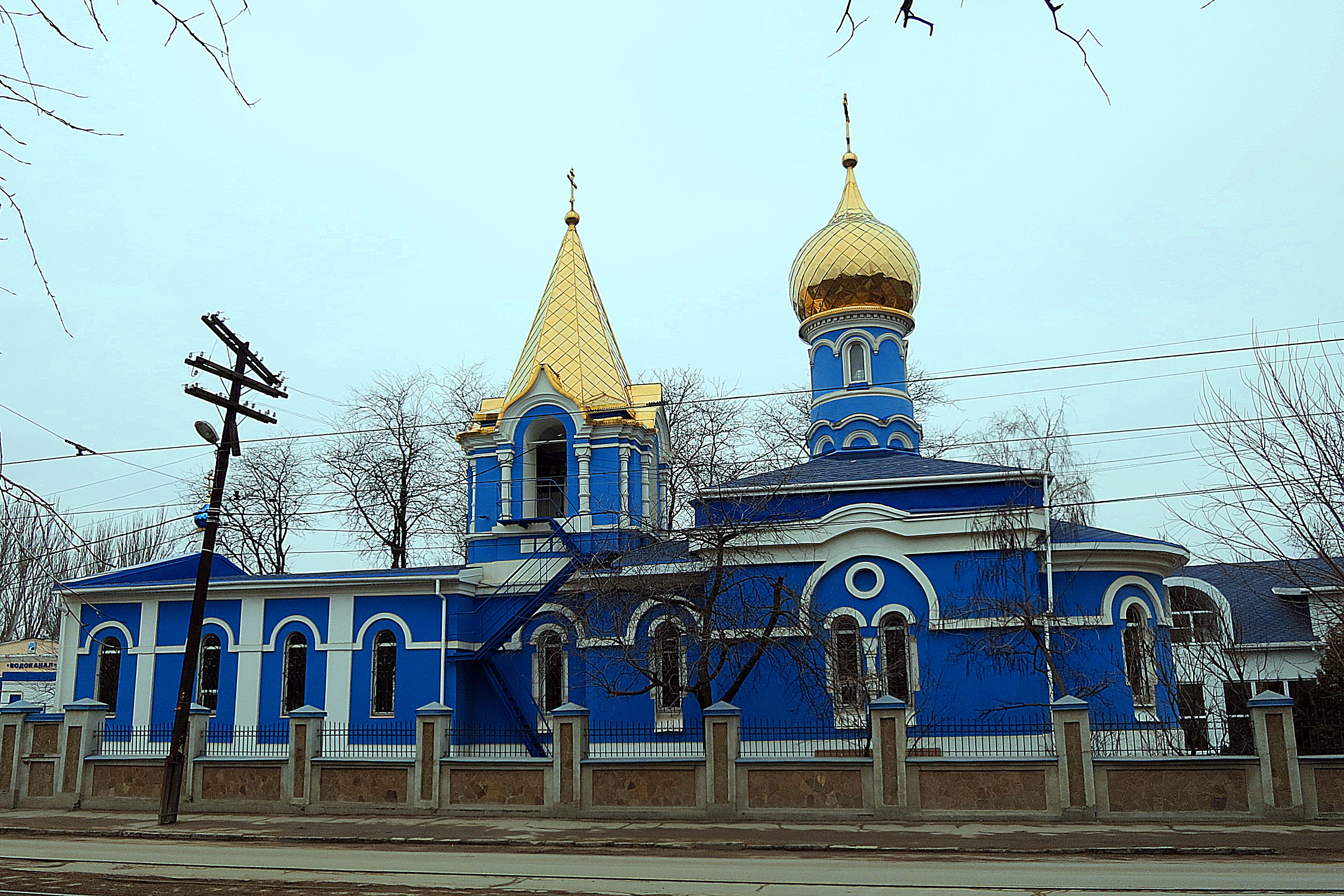

Religion
- Affiliation: Russian Orthodox

Location
- Location: Rostov-on-Don, Rostov Oblast, Russia
- Interactive map of Church of the Saint Queen Alexandra

Architecture
- Architect: Vladimir Popov
- Style: Russian Revival
- Completed: 1904

Church of the Saint Queen Alexandra (Russian: Церковь во имя Святой царицы Александры) ― an Orthodox church in Rostov-on-Don, Russia. It was built in 1904 in the town of Nakhichevan-on-Don (now a part of the Proletarian District of Rostov-on-Don). The author of the project was architect Vladimir Popov. The main altar was consecrated in the name of the Saint Queen Alexandra, and northern chapel is dedicated to Saint Alexander Nevsky. Church of St. Alexandra has the status of an object of cultural heritage of regional significance.

== History ==
Church of the Saint Queen Alexandra was built in 1904 at the Orthodox cemetery of Nakhichevan-on-Don to replace a wooden chapel there.

For this reason, the size of the temple is relatively small: about 18 × 13 metres.

Architect Vladimir Popov built the church in Russian Revival style. In 1910, there was constructed a belfry, and in 1920 ― a narthex. Church of Queen Alexandra was initially assigned to the Sofia Church (which hasn't preserved). During the Nazi occupation of the city at Alexandrian cemetery there were buried Romanian Orthodox soldiers.

In 1955, on the north side of the temple, there was constructed a chapel in the name of the Saint Prince Alexander Nevsky ― in memory of the demolished church of Alexander Nevsky in Nakhichevan-on-Don.

To celebrate the 1000th anniversary of the Christianization of Rus', the dome was gilded.

Sunday school operates at the Alexandrian Church. In 2002 at church there was established a Museum of Archpriest Ioann Domovsky, who served in the Temple of Alexander Nevsky.
