= Napoleon Iłłakowicz =

Polish painter and decorator (1811–1861)

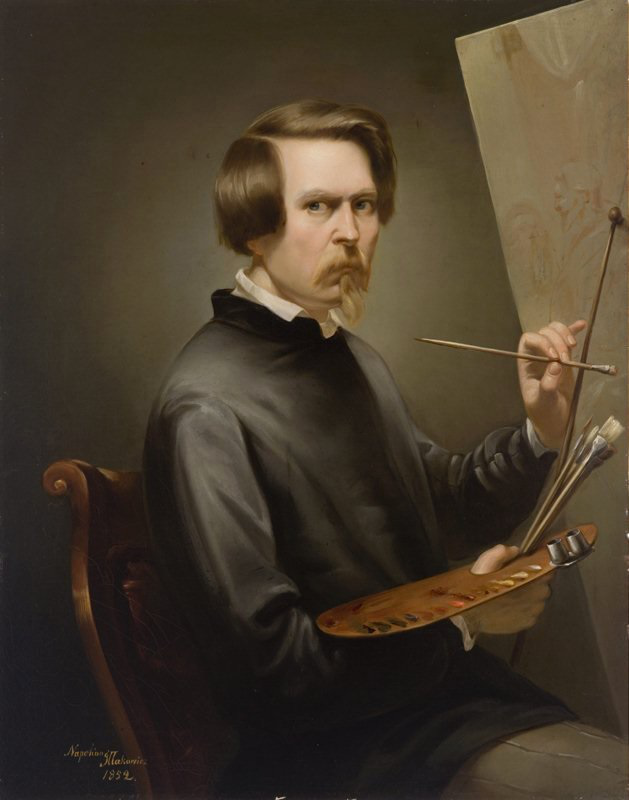
- Self Portrait (1852)
- Born: Gustaw Gwozdecki; 2 December 1811
- Died: 7 November 1861 (aged 49); Vilnius, Russian Empire
- Education: Vilnius University
- Known for: Painting

Napoleon Iłłakowicz (lit: Napoleonas Ylakavičius, 2 December 1811 – 7 November 1861) was a Lithuanian-Polish painter and decorator. The founder of his family was the Samogitian nobleman Steponas Nakaitis (Stefan Nakaytis czily Naczko), who lived at the end of the 16th century. He completed his secondary education, where he participated in drawing with Maciej Przybylski. From 1830, he studied painting at the Vilnius University in Jan Rustem's art workshops. He took part in the November Uprising. Due to the failure of the uprising, he emigrated to France, where between 1833 and 1836 he continued his studies. He also studied in Zaragoza. He worked in London at the court of Queen Victoria, as well as in Italy, Spain, and other countries. In 1848, he moved to live in Lwów, in 1857 to Vilnius, where he lived until his death.

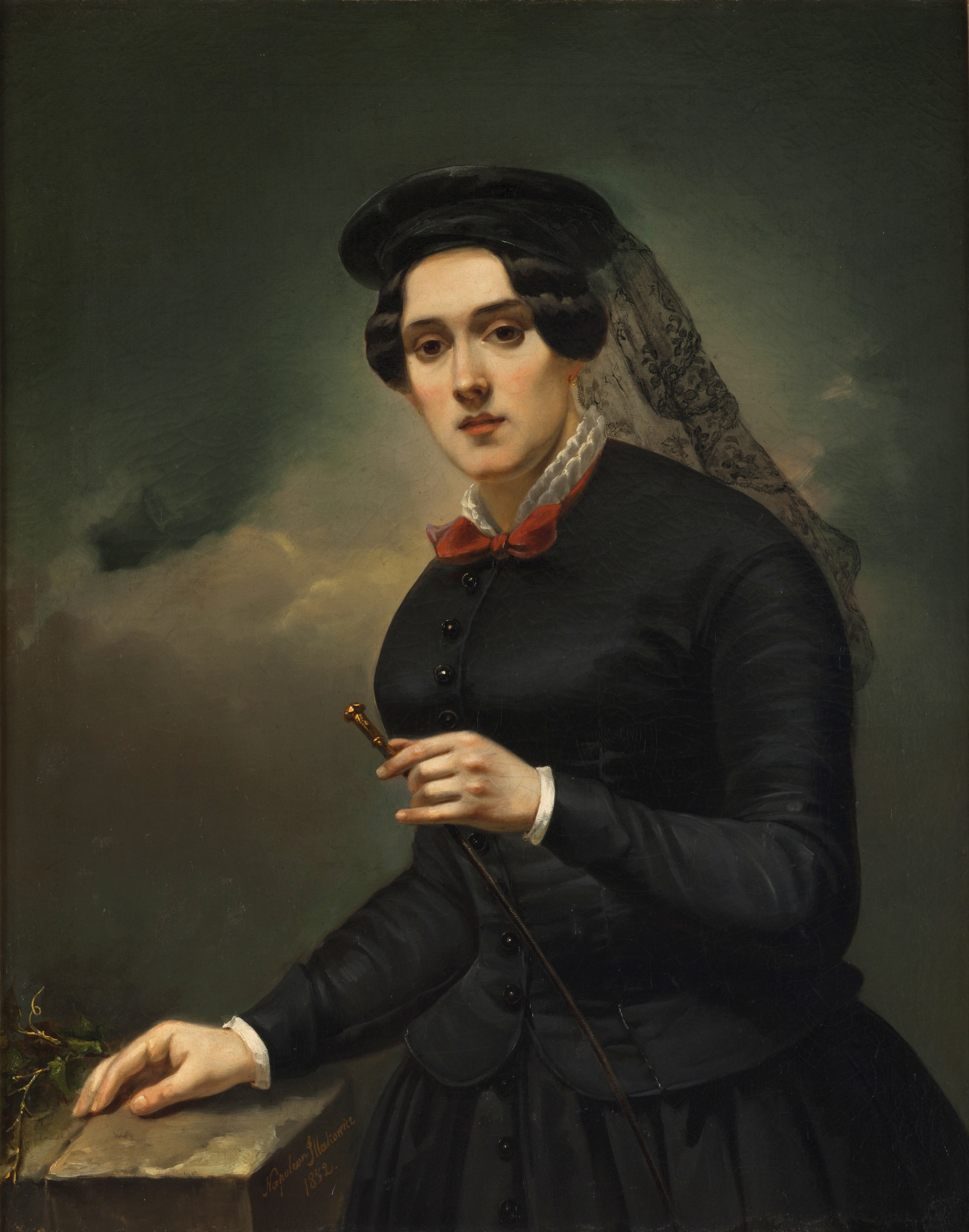
Portrait of Amazonka
(1852)

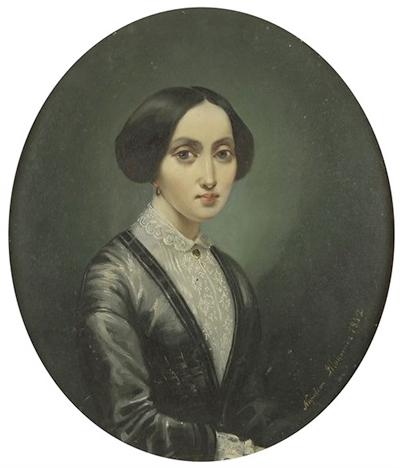
Portrait of an aristocrat
(1852)

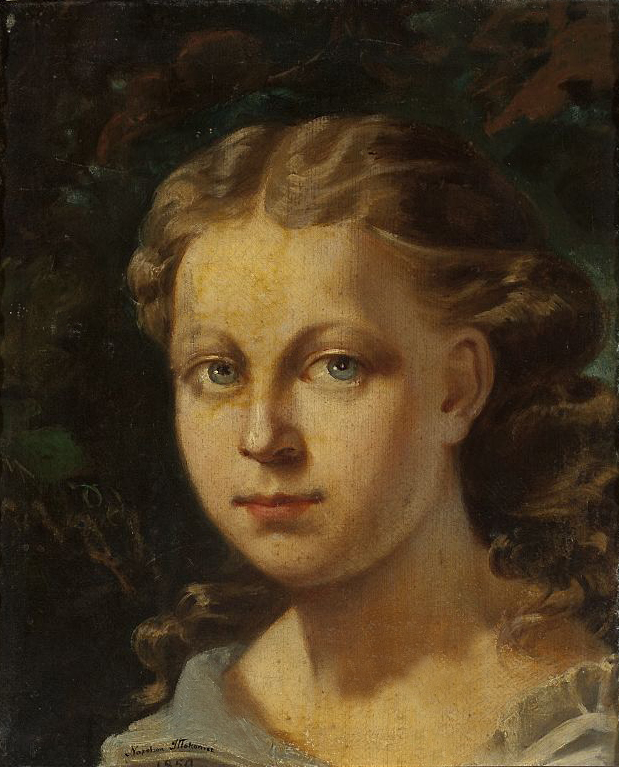
Portrait of Ludwika Zamoyska Rozwadowska
(1859)
