= Popoff =

Popoff is a surname, a Germannized spelling of the Russian surname Popov. Notable people with the surname include:

- A. Jay Popoff and Jeremy Popoff, of American band Lit from 1988
- Alicia Popoff (1950–2015), Canadian abstract painter
- Frank Popoff (1935–2024), Bulgarian American businessman
- Martin Popoff (born 1963), Canadian music journalist, critic, and author
- Peter Popoff (born 1946), German-born American faith healer, fraudster, and televangelist
- Vice Admiral Popoff (or Popov), Russian admiral and ship designer
