= Nikolay Popov (disambiguation) =

Nikolay Popov or Nikolai Popov may refer to:

- Nikolay Popov (1931–2008), Soviet engineer, tank designer
- Nikolai B. Popov, Bulgarian translator
- Nikolay Popov (revolutionary), Soviet revolutionary, a Third Secretary of the Communist Party of Ukraine
