= Eusebie Popovici =

Romanian politician (1863–1937)

Eusebie Popovici (October 20, 1863–November 15, 1937) was an Austro-Hungarian-born Romanian politician and teacher.

Born in Rușii-Mănăstioara, a village southeast of Suceava, he attended the Suceava Gymnasium, followed by the University of Innsbruck, from which he received a doctorate in philology. He taught Romanian and Latin at the Cernăuți normal school (1889-1890) and at the Suceava Gymnasium (1890-1928); he was also principal of the Suceava girls’ high school. He authored a number of textbooks. Active in politics and culture, he founded a credit union in Suceava (1898) and a patriotic association (1908), which he led. He joined the Romanian Radical Party (1898), the Romanian National Party of Bukovina (1905) and the Christian Social Party of Bukovina (1908).

In 1918, he was at the forefront of the citizens of Suceava who demanded an end to Austrian rule. Elected a member of the Romanian National Council in October, he became its vice president the following month. In early November, he became mayor of Suceava, succeeding the Austrian incumbent and welcoming the Romanian Army upon its entry. He represented the city in the congress that voted for union with Romania on November 28. In 1920, he was leader of the People's Party for Suceava County, later holding a similar position within the National Liberal Party. He sat in the Assembly of Deputies in 1920-1921 and in 1926–1927. He was again mayor of Suceava in 1926–1927.

After retiring from politics, he was in good health and remained active in public life. While getting off a train at Suceava railway station, he slipped and fell, fracturing his leg, an incident some considered suspicious. He eventually died as a result. The funeral was attended by a large crowd of officials, ordinary citizens and former students, with 22 Orthodox priests performing the liturgy, led by Visarion Puiu, and a military honor guard in attendance. He was buried in Suceava's central cemetery.
