= Vasilije Popović =

Vasilije Popović may refer to:

- Vasilije Popović (cleric) (1860–1938), Serbian Orthodox Metropolitan
- Vasilije Popović (revolutionary) (1775–1832), Serbian revolutionary
- Vasilije Popović, real name of Pavle Ugrinov (1926–2007), Serbian writer, playwright, director and academic
- Vasilije Popović–Cico, author of the National emblem of North Macedonia
- Vasilije Popović (production designer), winner of a Golden Arena for Best Production Design
