= Mikhail Abramovich Popov =

Mikhail Abramovich Popov (Russian: Михаил Абрамович Попов) (1753, Kungur – September 8, 1811) was a Russian businessman and politician, merchant of the second guild and the first mayor of Perm.

Mikhail Abramovich Popov was born in 1753, in the family of Abram Popov (1724—?), a merchant from Cherdyn, and his wife Praskovya Ivanovna Vereshchagina. He had a brother named Pyotr and a sister named Dominica. In 1764 his father moved to Kungur.

When in 1781 Perm vice-gerency was founded, Popov moved to Perm and was elected mayor of Perm. He obtained 29 votes while his rival Fyodor Yefimovich Bykov had only 14. He held the office of mayor two times, from October 18, 1781, till October 18, 1784, and from 1793 till 1796. He died September 8, 1811, and was buried at the Yegoshikha Cemetery.

Preceded by —	Mayor of Perm; 1781—1784	Succeeded by Fyodor Yefimovich Bykov
Preceded by Pyotr Abramovich Popov	Mayor of Perm; 1793—1796	Succeeded by Ivan Nikolayevich Korshunov
