= Boris Popovich =

Russian footballer

Personal information
- Full name: Boris Nikolayevich Popovich
- Date of birth: 1896
- Date of death: 1943 (aged 46–47)
- Position: Midfielder

Senior career*
Years	Team	Apps	(Gls)
1913–1916	SKL Moscow		

International career
1914	Russia	1	(0)
- * Club domestic league appearances and goals

Boris Nikolayevich Popovich (Russian: Бори́с Никола́евич Попо́вич; 1896–1943) was an association football player.

== International career ==
Popovich played his only game for Russia on July 12, 1914, in a friendly against Norway.
