= Alexander Fadeyev (artist) =

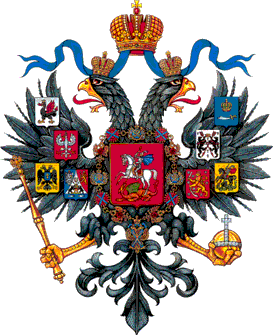
The lesser coat of arms of the Empire of Russia, designed by Alexander Fadeyev in 1856.

Alexander Alexandrovich Fadeyev (Russian: Александр Александрович Фадеев; born 1811 in Tallinn, Russian Empire (present-day Estonia) - died 16 November 1889) was a Russian heraldic artist.

== Life ==
Fadeyev graduated from the Imperial Academy of Arts in Saint Petersburg in 1848. He cooperated for several years with the heraldic artist Bernhard Karl von Koehne. Together they designed decorations for the coronation ceremony of Emperor Alexander II of Russia in 1856 as well as the so-called great coat of arms of the Russian Empire which was officially taken into use in 1857. Fadeyev himself designed the so-called lesser coat of arms in the centre of the great coat of arms, which was accepted in 1856. The great coat of arms remained in use practically unchanged until 1917. In 1857 Fadeyev was appointed director of the coat of arms office of the heraldic department of the Governing Senate, where he remained for over 30 years. Fadeyev also designed the coats of arms for the members of the Russian imperial family as well as the coats of arms for hundreds of Russian noble families. He was awarded the title of collegial reistrator in 1861 and the title of collegial accessor in 1875.

Fadeyev designed the first banknotes and coins of the Finnish markka for the Grand Duchy of Finland from 1860 to 1862.
