= List of women astronauts =

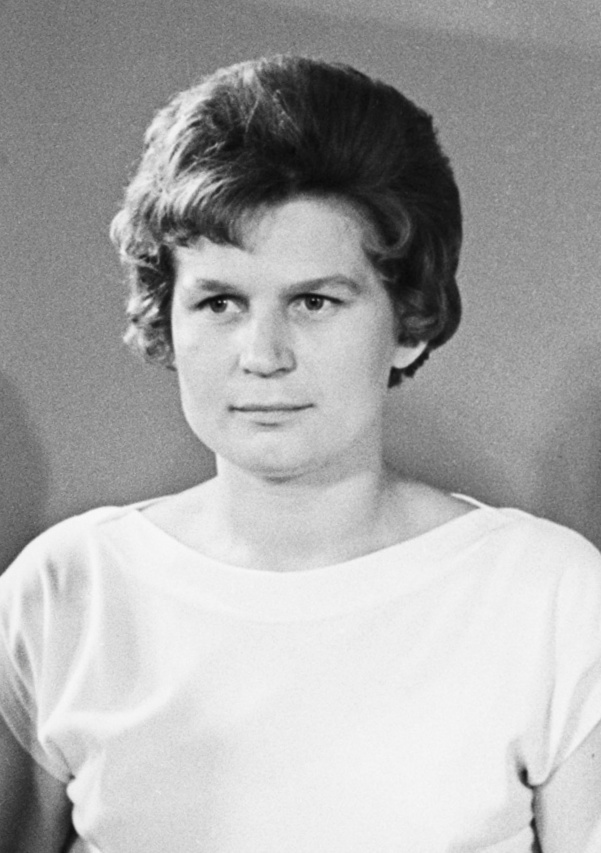
In 1963 Soviet cosmonaut Valentina Tereshkova became the first woman in space on her Vostok 6 flight of 48 orbits, and is the only woman to fly solo in space.

The following is a list of women who have traveled into space serving as a commander or crew member of a spacecraft, commonly referred to as astronauts or cosmonauts, sorted by date of first flight. This list includes Russian cosmonauts, who were the first women to cross the Kármán line into space. Valentina Tereshkova became the first woman to go to space in 1963, very early in crewed space exploration, and it would be almost twenty years before another flew (Svetlana Savitskaya).

By the end of the 1980s, women in space had become more common. By 2019, roughly 12% of all the space travelers were women. As of April 2025, 105 women had completed spaceflights and counting the astronauts that haven't completed any spaceflight there are 119.

== History ==
As of May 2023, there has been one female space traveler each from France, Italy, South Korea, Saudi Arabia, and the United Kingdom; two each from Canada and Japan; three from China; six from the Soviet Union/Russia; and 56 from the United States. The time between the first male and first female astronauts varied widely by country. The first astronauts originally from Britain, South Korea, and Iran were women, while there was a two-year gap in Russia from the first man in space on Vostok 1 to the first woman in space on Vostok 6. The time between the first American man and first American woman in space was 22 years between Freedom 7 and STS-7, respectively. For China, this interval was almost eight and a half years between the Shenzhou 5 and Shenzhou 9 space missions, and for Italy, there was approximately twelve years between the STS-46 and Expedition 42 spaceflights.

A span of 19 years separated the first two women in space. They were cosmonauts on the Vostok 6 and Soyuz T-7 missions. Though the Soviet Union sent the first two women into space, only six of the women in space have been Russian or Soviet citizens. However, British, French, Italian, dual-citizen Iranian-American and South Korean women have all flown as part of the Soviet and Russian space programs. Similarly, women from Canada, Japan, and America have all flown under the US space program. A span of one year separated the first and second American women in space, as well as the first and second Chinese women in space, taking place on consecutive missions, Shenzhou 9 and Shenzhou 10.

== Spacefarers with current and completed spaceflights ==
The below is a list of astronauts and cosmonauts that have served as commanders/crews on space-flights. Note that it does not include non-crew space tourists, which are also referred to as spaceflight participants.

#	Image	Name Birth date	Country	Comment	Missions (launch date)
1		Valentina Tereshkova; Mar. 6, 1937	Soviet Union	First woman in space. Only woman to make a solo spaceflight.	Vostok 6 (June 16, 1963)
2		Svetlana Savitskaya; Aug. 8, 1948	Soviet Union	First woman to fly on a space station (Salyut 7, 1982). First woman to perform a spacewalk (Jul. 25, 1984). First woman to make two spaceflights.	Soyuz T-5 (Jul. 19, 1982); Soyuz T-12 (Jul. 17, 1984)
3		Sally Ride; May 26, 1951 died Jul. 23, 2012	United States	First American woman in space. Posthumously acknowledged as the first LGBT person in space.	STS-7 (Jun. 18, 1983); STS-41-G (Oct. 5, 1984)
4		Judith Resnik; Apr. 5, 1949 died Jan. 28, 1986	United States	Fourth woman in space, second American woman in space. First Jewish woman in space. Died in the Challenger disaster.	STS-41-D (Aug. 30, 1984); STS-51-L (Jan. 28, 1986)
5		Kathryn D. Sullivan; Oct. 3, 1951	United States	Second woman to perform a spacewalk. (Oct. 11, 1984)	STS-41-G (Oct. 5, 1984); STS-31 (April 24, 1990); STS-45 (Mar. 24, 1992)
6		Anna Lee Fisher; Aug. 24, 1949	United States	First mother in space.	STS-51-A (Nov. 8, 1984)
7		Margaret Rhea Seddon; Nov. 8, 1947	United States		STS-51-D (Apr. 12, 1985); STS-40 (Jun. 5, 1991); STS-58 (Oct. 18, 1993)
8		Shannon Lucid; Jan. 14, 1943	United States	First American woman to fly on a space station (Mir, 1996). First Chinese-born woman in space. First woman to make a third, a fourth and a fifth spaceflight.	STS-51-G (Jun. 17, 1985); STS-34 (Oct. 18, 1989); STS-43 (Aug. 2, 1991); STS-58 (Oct. 18, 1993); STS-76/79 (Mar. 22, 1996)
9		Bonnie J. Dunbar; Mar. 3, 1949	United States		STS-61-A (Oct. 30, 1985); STS-32 (Jan. 9, 1990); STS-50 (Jun. 25, 1992); STS-71 (Jun. 27, 1995); STS-89 (Jan. 22, 1998)
10		Mary L. Cleave; Feb. 5, 1947 died Nov. 27 2023	United States		STS-61-B (Nov. 26, 1985); STS-30 (May 4, 1989)
11		Ellen S. Baker; Apr. 27, 1953	United States		STS-34 (Oct. 18, 1989); STS-50 (Jun. 25, 1992); STS-71 (Jun. 27, 1995)
12		Kathryn C. Thornton; Aug. 17, 1952	United States	Third woman to walk in space. First woman to make multiple EVAs (May 14–15, 1992, Dec. 6, 1993, Dec. 8, 1993)	STS-33 (Nov. 22, 1989); STS-49 (May 7, 1992); STS-61 (Dec. 2, 1993); STS-73 (Oct. 20, 1995)
13		Marsha Ivins; Apr. 15, 1951	United States		STS-32 (Jan. 9, 1990); STS-46 (Jul. 31, 1992); STS-62 (Mar. 4, 1994); STS-81 (Jan. 12, 1997); STS-98 (Feb. 7, 2001)
14		Linda M. Godwin; Jul. 2, 1952	United States	Fourth woman to walk in space (Mar. 27, 1996, Dec. 10, 2001)	STS-37 (Apr. 5, 1991); STS-59 (Apr. 9, 1994); STS-76 (Mar. 22, 1996); STS-108 (Dec. 5, 2001)
15		Helen Sharman; May 30, 1963	United Kingdom	First British citizen in space. First European woman outside of Soviet Union in space. Second woman to fly on a space station (Mir, 1991).	Soyuz TM-12/TM-11 (May 18, 1991)
16		Tamara E. Jernigan; May 7, 1959	United States	Fifth woman to walk in space (May 30, 1999)	STS-40 (Jun. 5, 1991); STS-52 (Oct. 22, 1992); STS-67 (Mar. 2, 1995); STS-80 (Nov. 19, 1996); STS-96 (May 27, 1999)
17		Millie Hughes-Fulford; Dec. 21, 1945 died Feb. 2, 2021	United States	First female payload specialist.	STS-40 (Jun. 5, 1991)
18		Roberta Bondar; Dec. 4, 1945	Canada	First Canadian woman in space. First Ukrainian Canadian woman in space.	STS-42 (Jan. 22, 1992) the first neurologist in space.
19		Nancy Jan Davis; Nov. 1, 1953	United States	With husband Mark Lee, became the first married couple to launch into space together (STS-47).	STS-47 (Sep. 12, 1992); STS-60 (Feb. 3, 1994); STS-85 (Aug. 7, 1997)
20		Mae Jemison; Oct. 17, 1956	United States	First African American woman in space	STS-47 (Sep. 12, 1992)
21		Susan J. Helms; Feb. 26, 1958	United States	Sixth woman to walk in space (Mar. 11, 2001). This walk was the longest duration EVA by a woman (8h 56m).	STS-54 (Jan. 13, 1993); STS-64 (Sep. 9, 1994); STS-78 (Jun. 20, 1996); STS-101 (May 19, 2000); STS-102/105 (Mar. 8, 2001)
22		Ellen Ochoa; May 10, 1958	United States	First Hispanic American woman in space.	STS-56 (Apr. 8, 1993); STS-66 (Nov. 3, 1994); STS-96 (May 27, 1999); STS-110 (Apr. 8, 2002)
23		Janice E. Voss; Oct. 8, 1956 died Feb. 6, 2012	United States		STS-57 (Jun. 21, 1993); STS-63 (Feb. 3, 1995); STS-83 (Apr. 4, 1997); STS-94 (Jul. 1, 1997); STS-99 (Feb. 11, 2000)
24		Nancy J. Currie; Dec. 29, 1958	United States		STS-57 (Jun. 21, 1993); STS-70 (Jul. 13, 1995); STS-88 (Dec. 4, 1998); STS-109 (Mar. 1, 2002)
25		Chiaki Mukai; May 6, 1952	Japan	First Japanese woman and first Asian woman in space.	STS-65 (Jul. 8, 1994); STS-95 (Oct. 29, 1998)
26		Yelena V. Kondakova; Mar. 30, 1957	Russia	First Russian woman to travel in two different spacecraft, Soyuz TM-20 and STS-84; both were on trips to Mir Space Station. First Russian woman to travel on the Space Shuttle.	Soyuz TM-20 (Oct. 3, 1994); STS-84 (May 15, 1997)
27		Eileen Collins; Nov. 19, 1956	United States	First female shuttle pilot (STS-63) and shuttle commander (STS-93).	STS-63 (Feb. 3, 1995); STS-84 (May 15, 1997); STS-93 (Jul. 23, 1999); STS-114 (Jul. 26, 2005)
28		Wendy B. Lawrence; Jul. 2, 1959	United States	Second known LGBT person in space.	STS-67 (Mar. 2, 1995); STS-86 (Sep. 25, 1997); STS-91 (Jun. 2, 1998); STS-114 (Jul. 26, 2005)
29		Mary E. Weber; Aug. 24, 1962	United States		STS-70 (Jul. 13, 1995); STS-101 (May 19, 2000)
30		Catherine Coleman; Dec. 14, 1960	United States		STS-73 (Oct. 20, 1995); STS-93 (Jul. 23, 1999); Soyuz TMA-20 (Dec. 15, 2010)
31		Claudie Haigneré; May 13, 1957	France	First Frenchwoman in space. 1996 flight as Claudie André-Deshays.	Soyuz TM-24/TM-23 (Aug. 17, 1996); Soyuz TM-33/32 (Oct. 21, 2001)
32		Susan Still Kilrain; Oct. 24, 1961	United States	Second female shuttle pilot.	STS-83 (Apr. 4, 1997); STS-94 (Jul. 1, 1997)
33		Kalpana Chawla; Mar. 17, 1962 died Feb. 1, 2003	United States	First Asian American (Indian origin, naturalized U.S. citizen) woman in space. First Hindu woman in space. Died in the Columbia disaster.	STS-87 (Nov. 19, 1997); STS-107 (Jan. 16, 2003)
34		Kathryn P. Hire; Aug. 26, 1959	United States		STS-90 (Apr. 17, 1998); STS-130 (Feb. 8, 2010)
35		Janet L. Kavandi; Jul. 17, 1959	United States		STS-91 (Jun. 2, 1998); STS-99 (Feb. 11, 2000); STS-104 (Jul. 12, 2001)
36		Julie Payette; Oct. 20, 1963	Canada	Second Canadian woman in space. First French Canadian woman in space. Became Governor General of Canada in 2017.	STS-96 (May 27, 1999); STS-127 (Jul. 15, 2009)
37		Pamela Melroy; Sep. 17, 1961	United States	Second female shuttle commander (STS-120). Appointed Deputy Administrator of NASA Jun. 21, 2021.	STS-92 (Oct. 11, 2000); STS-112 (Oct. 7, 2002); STS-120 (Oct. 23, 2007)
38		Peggy Whitson; Feb. 9, 1960	United States	Most time in space (cumulative) for a US astronaut (675 days); Seventh woman to walk in space (Aug. 16, 2002, Nov. 9, 2007, Nov. 20, 2007, Nov. 24, 2007, Dec. 18, 2007, Jan. 30, 2007, Jan. 6, 2017, Mar. 30, 2017, May 12, 2017, May 23, 2017). Most EVAs (10) and most time spent on EVA (60 hrs 21 min) of all female space travelers. First female ISS commander (ISS Expedition 16).	STS-111/113 (Jun. 5, 2002); Soyuz TMA-11 (Oct. 10, 2007); Soyuz MS-03/04 (Nov. 17, 2016); Axiom Mission 2 (May 21, 2023); Axiom Mission 4 (Jun. 22, 2025)
39		Sandra Magnus; Oct. 30, 1964	United States		STS-112 (Oct. 7, 2002); STS-126/119 (Nov. 14, 2008); STS-135 (Jul. 8, 2011)
40		Laurel B. Clark; Mar. 10, 1961 died Feb. 1, 2003	United States	Died in the Columbia disaster.	STS-107 (Jan. 16, 2003)
41		Stephanie Wilson; Sep. 27, 1966	United States	The second African American woman to go into space	STS-121 (Jul. 4, 2006); STS-120 (Oct. 23, 2007); STS-131 (Apr. 5, 2010)
42		Lisa Nowak; May 10, 1963	United States		STS-121 (Jul. 4, 2006)
43		Heidemarie Stefanyshyn-Piper; Feb. 7, 1963	United States	Eighth woman to walk in space (Sep. 12, 2006, Sep. 15, 2006, Nov. 18-19, 2008, Nov. 20-21, 2008, Nov. 22-23, 2008). First Ukrainian American woman in space.	STS-115 (Sep. 9, 2006); STS-126 (Nov. 14, 2008)
44		Anousheh Ansari; Sep. 12, 1966	Iran / United States	Fourth space tourist and first female space tourist. First Iranian and first Muslim woman in space.	Soyuz TMA-9/8 (Sep. 18, 2006)
45		Sunita Williams; Sep. 19, 1965	United States	Ninth woman to walk in space (Dec. 16, 2006, Jan. 31, 2007, Feb. 4, 2007, Feb. 8, 2007, Aug. 30, 2012, Sep. 5, 2012). First female astronaut to fly on an orbital spacecraft's maiden flight, i.e., Boeing Starliner.	STS-116/117 (December 9, 2006); Soyuz TMA-05M (July 15, 2012); Starliner Crewed Flight Test (June 5, 2024) (Note: returned to Earth on SpaceX Crew-9)
46		Joan Higginbotham; August 3, 1964	United States		STS-116 (Dec. 9, 2006)
47		Tracy Caldwell Dyson; August 14, 1969	United States	Eleventh woman to walk in space (Aug. 7, 2010, Aug. 11, 2010, Aug. 16, 2010). First astronaut born after Apollo 11 flight.	STS-118 (Aug. 8, 2007); Soyuz TMA-18 (Apr. 2, 2010); Soyuz MS-25 (Mar. 23, 2024)
48		Barbara Morgan; Nov. 28, 1951	United States	First educator astronaut. Originally selected for the Teacher in Space Project.	STS-118 (Aug. 8, 2007)
49		Yi So-yeon; Jun. 2, 1978	Republic of Korea	First Korean in space.	Soyuz TMA-12 (Apr. 8, 2008)
50		Karen L. Nyberg; Oct. 7, 1969	United States		STS-124 (May 31, 2008); Soyuz TMA-09M (May 28, 2013)
51		K. Megan McArthur; Aug. 30, 1971	United States		STS-125 (May 11, 2009); SpaceX Crew-2 (Apr. 23, 2021)
52		Nicole P. Stott; Nov. 11, 1962	United States	Tenth woman to walk in space (Sep. 1–2, 2009).	STS-128/129 (Aug. 28, 2009); STS-133 (Feb. 24, 2011)
53		Dorothy Metcalf-Lindenburger; May 15, 1975	United States	First Space Camp alumna to become an astronaut	STS-131 (Apr. 5, 2010)
54		Naoko Yamazaki; Dec. 27, 1970	Japan		STS-131 (Apr. 5, 2010)
55		Shannon Walker; Jun. 4, 1965	United States	First Native Houstonian to go aboard the International Space Station. She returned to space for her second long duration mission on 15 November 2020, onboard SpaceX Crew-1, the first operational flight of SpaceX's Crew Dragon spacecraft.	Soyuz TMA-19 (Jun. 15, 2010); SpaceX Crew-1 (Nov. 15, 2020)
56		Liu Yang; Oct. 6, 1978	China	First Chinese woman in space. Second Chinese woman and nineteenth woman to walk in space.	Shenzhou 9 (Jun. 16, 2012), Shenzhou 14 (Jun. 5, 2022)
57		Wang Yaping; Jan. 27, 1980	China	First Chinese woman on long duration expedition. Sixteenth woman to walk in space (November 7, 2021) during Shenzhou 13. First Chinese female astronaut to walk in space.	Shenzhou 10 (Jun. 11, 2013); Shenzhou 13 (Oct. 15, 2021)
58		Yelena Serova; Apr. 22, 1976	Russia	Member of ISS Expedition 41. First Russian woman to visit the ISS.	Soyuz TMA-14M (Sep. 25, 2014)
59		Samantha Cristoforetti; Apr. 26, 1977	Italy	ESA Astronaut. First Italian woman in space and first Italian woman on the ISS, with Expedition 42/43. Eighteenth woman to walk in space, during Expedition 67.	Soyuz TMA-15M (Nov. 23, 2014); SpaceX Crew-4 (Apr. 27, 2022)
60		Kathleen Rubins; Oct. 14, 1978	United States	Twelfth woman to walk in space (Aug. 19, 2016, Sep. 01, 2016) during ISS Expedition 48.	Soyuz MS-01 (Jul. 6, 2016); Soyuz MS-17 (Oct. 14, 2020)
61		Serena Auñón-Chancellor; Apr. 9, 1976	United States		Soyuz MS-09 (Jun. 6, 2018)
62		Anne McClain; Jun. 7, 1979	United States	Thirteenth woman to walk in space (Mar. 22, 2019, Apr. 08, 2019) during ISS Expedition 59. Third known LGBT person in space. Falsely accused of what would have been the first crime committed in space.	Soyuz MS-11 (Dec. 3, 2018); SpaceX Crew-10 (Mar. 14, 2025)
63		Beth Moses; May 29, 1969	United States	Virgin Galactic Chief instructor. First woman to make a spaceflight (US Department of Defense classification i.e. >50 mi (80.47 km)) on a commercially launched vehicle. The maximum altitude achieved was 295,007 ft (55.87 mi, 89.92 km).	Virgin Galactic Unity 22 (July 11, 2021); Virgin Galactic Unity 25 (May 25, 2023); Galactic 02 (Aug. 10. 2023); Galactic 03 (Sept. 08, 2023); Galactic 04 (Oct. 06, 2023)
64		Christina Koch; Feb. 2, 1979	United States	Fourteenth woman to walk in space, during Expedition 59. Jointly with Jessica Meir, became the first two women to undertake an all-female EVA during ISS Expedition 61 (Oct 18, 2019). Greatest continuous number of days in space for a female (328 days). First woman to fly above low Earth orbit. First woman to fly around the Moon.	Soyuz MS-12/13 (Mar. 14, 2019); Artemis II (Apr. 1, 2026)
65		Jessica Meir; Jul. 15, 1977	United States / Sweden	Fifteenth woman to walk in space, during Expedition 61. Jointly with Christina Koch, became the first two women to undertake an all-female EVA. (Oct 18, 2019)	Soyuz MS-15 (Sep. 25, 2019)
66		Sian Proctor; Mar. 26, 1970	United States	First female commercial astronaut spaceship pilot First African-American commercial astronaut	Inspiration4 (Sep. 16, 2021)
67		Hayley Arceneaux; Dec. 9, 1991	United States	First in space with a prosthesis, a St. Jude Children's Research Hospital employee and bone cancer survivor who is now a physician assistant	Inspiration4 (Sep. 16, 2021)
68		Yulia Peresild; Sep. 5, 1984	Russia	First actress in space, filming footage for the 2023 film The Challenge aboard the International Space Station.	Soyuz MS-19 (Oct. 5, 2021)
69		Kayla Barron; Sep. 19, 1987	United States	Seventeenth woman to walk in space.	SpaceX Crew-3/Expedition 66. (Nov. 10, 2021)
70		Jessica Watkins; May 14, 1988	United States	First African-American woman on a long-duration mission.	SpaceX Crew-4 (Apr. 27, 2022)
71		Nicole Aunapu Mann; Jun. 27, 1977	United States	First Native American woman in space. Twentieth woman to walk in space, during Expedition 68.	SpaceX Crew-5 (Oct. 5, 2022)
72		Anna Kikina; Aug.27, 1984	Russia	First Russian cosmonaut to fly a Crew Dragon.	SpaceX Crew-5 (Oct. 5, 2022)
73		Rayyanah Barnawi; Sep., 1988	Saudi Arabia	First female Saudi astronaut in space.	Axiom Mission 2 (May 21, 2023)
74		Kelly Latimer	United States	Pilot. Virgin Galactic	Galactic 02 (Aug. 10, 2023); Galactic 04 (Oct. 06, 2023); Galactic 05 (Nov. 02, 2023)
75		Jasmin Moghbeli; Jun. 24, 1983	United States	Twenty-first woman to walk in space, during Expedition 70.	SpaceX Crew-7 (Aug. 26, 2023)
76		Loral O'Hara; May 3, 1983	United States	Twenty-second woman to walk in space, during Expedition 70.	Soyuz MS-24 (Sep. 15, 2023)
77		Kellie Gerardi; February 16, 1989	United States		Galactic 05 (Nov. 02, 2023)
78		Jeanette J. Epps; Nov. 2, 1970	United States		SpaceX Crew-8 (Mar. 4, 2024)
79		Marina Vasilevskaya; Sept. 14, 1990	Belarus		Soyuz MS-25/MS-24 (Mar. 23, 2024)
80		Sarah Gillis; Jan. 1, 1994	United States	Twenty-second woman, and first female private spaceflight participant to walk in space. As of October 2024, current record holder for the youngest spacewalker ever. First person to play violin in space.	Polaris Dawn (Sep. 10, 2024)
81		Anna Menon; Dec. 24, 1985	United States		Polaris Dawn (Sep. 10, 2024)
82		Wang Haoze; Mar. 1990	China		Shenzhou 19 (Oct. 29, 2024)
83		Nichole Ayers; Dec. 13, 1988	United States		SpaceX Crew-10 (Mar. 14, 2025)
84		Jannicke Mikkelsen; Jun. 8, 1986	Norway / United Kingdom (Note: Mikkelsen was born in the United Kingdom, but is now a citizen of Norway. She will wear the flag of Norway on her spacesuit during the spaceflight.)	First Norwegian in space. First polar retrograde orbit, i.e., flying over Earth's poles. The first European astronaut to command a spacecraft.	Fram2 (Apr. 1, 2025)
85		Rabea Rogge; 1995	Germany	First German woman. First polar retrograde orbit with Jannicke Mikkelsen.	Fram2 (Apr. 1, 2025)
86		Zena Cardman; Oct. 26, 1987	United States	NASA Astronaut Group 22 First female astronaut to assume command on her maiden spaceflight.	SpaceX Crew-11 (Aug. 1, 2025)
87		Christa McAuliffe; Sep. 2, 1948 died Jan. 28, 1986	United States	Part of the Teacher in Space Project. Would have been the first private citizen in space. Died on the Challenger, January 28, 1986. Mission launched, but did not cross the Kármán line. The crew cabin peaked approx. 70,000 ft (above the Armstrong limit).	STS-51-L (Jan. 28, 1986)
88		Sophie Adenot; 1982	France	2022 ESA Astronaut Group	SpaceX Crew-12 (Expedition 74/75)
89		Lai Ka-ying; Nov. 1982	China	CNSA Group 4 First Hong Kong born and raised astronaut in space First Hong Kong woman in space	Shenzhou 23 (May 24, 2026)

== Spacefarers without a current or completed spaceflight ==
Below is a list of women that were selected as astronauts or cosmonauts, but have not completed a spaceflight mission yet, or were unable to complete a spaceflight mission for various reasons noted below. Note that it does not include non-crew space tourists, which are also referred to as spaceflight participants.

Image	Name Birth date	Country	Comment
	Patricia Robertson; Mar. 12, 1963; Died May 24, 2001	United States	Part of NASA Astronaut Group 17, killed in aircraft crash before making a spaceflight.
	Nadezhda Kuzhelnaya; Nov. 6, 1962	Russia	Assigned to Soyuz TM-32 (2001), but was cut to accommodate American space tourist Dennis Tito. Retired May 27, 2004.
	Marianne Merchez; Nov. 25, 1960	Belgium	Retired 1995
	Yvonne Cagle; Apr. 24, 1959	United States	Retired with the rank of colonel in 2008.
	Tatyana Kuznetsova; Jul. 14, 1941 died Aug. 23, 2018	Soviet Union	Assigned to cancelled Vostok 5. Retired 1969.
	Zhanna Yorkina; May 6, 1939 died May 25, 2015	Soviet Union	Retired 1969
	Irina Solovyova; Sep. 6, 1937	Soviet Union	Intended for cancelled all-woman Vostok 6 following Tereshkova on Vostok 5. Retired 1969.
	Valentina Ponomaryova; Sep. 18, 1933 died November 8, 2023	Soviet Union	Intended for cancelled all-woman Vostok 6 following Tereshkova on Vostok 5. Retired 1969.
	Jennifer Sidey-Gibbons; Aug. 3, 1988	Canada	Backup for Artemis II. 2017 CSA Group.
	Nora Al Matrooshi; 1993	United Arab Emirates	Emirati Astronaut Group 2
	Pratiwi Sudarmono; Jul. 31, 1952	Indonesia	Initially selected for STS-61-H mission for June 1986. Cancelled after Challenger disaster. Retired.
	Rosemary Coogan; 1991	United Kingdom	Astrophysicist, 2022 ESA Astronaut Group
	Meganne Christian; 1987	United Kingdom	Materials scientist, 2022 ESA Astronaut Group
	Anthea Comellini; 1992	Italy	Aerospace engineer, 2022 ESA Astronaut Group
	Sara García Alonso; 1989	Spain	2022 ESA Astronaut Group
	Carmen Possnig; 1988	Austria	2022 ESA Astronaut Group
	Amelie Schoenenwald; 1989	Germany	2022 ESA Astronaut Group
	Nicola Winter; 1985	Germany	2022 ESA Astronaut Group
	Katherine Bennell-Pegg; 1984	Australia	Australian Space Agency. Trained alongside 2022 ESA Astronaut Group.
	Mariam Fardous; 1984	Saudi Arabia	Saudi Astronaut Group 1, selected as Axiom Mission 2 backup, February 12, 2023.
	Christina Birch; Nov. 17, 1986	United States	NASA Astronaut Group 23
	Deniz Burnham; Oct. 1, 1985	Turkey / United States	NASA Astronaut Group 23
	Jessica Wittner; 1983	United States	NASA Astronaut Group 23

== See also ==
- Chinese women in space
- Mercury 13—the Women in Space Program (WISP)
- List of space travelers by name—all people who have flown in space
- List of space travelers by nationality
- List of astronauts by name—people trained to serve as spaceflight crew
