= Women in space =

Women who travel to space

A record four women simultaneously in space aboard the International Space Station in 2010 (Expedition 23 and STS-131). Clockwise from lower left: Tracy Caldwell Dyson, Dorothy Metcalf-Lindenburger, Naoko Yamazaki, and Stephanie Wilson

Women have flown and worked in outer space from the beginning of human spaceflight. Overall women have been significantly less often chosen to go to space than men, and in June 2020, constituted only 12% of all astronauts who had been to space. The proportion of women among space travelers has been increasing substantially over time.

The first woman to fly in space was Soviet Valentina Tereshkova, aboard the Vostok 6 space capsule on June 16–19, 1963. Tereshkova was a textile-factory assembly worker, rather than a pilot like the male cosmonauts flying at the time.

By October 2021, most of the 70 women who have been to space have been United States citizens, with missions on the Space Shuttle and on the International Space Station. Other countries (USSR, Canada, Japan, Russia, China, United Kingdom, France, South Korea, Italy, Belarus) have flown one, two or three women in human spaceflight programs. Additionally one woman of dual Iranian-US citizenship has participated as a tourist on a US spaceflight.

During the Artemis II lunar flyby in 2026, Christina Koch became the only woman to leave low Earth orbit and to travel around the Moon. The Artemis IV lunar landing, scheduled for 2028, is planned to send the first woman to lunar orbit and the lunar surface.

Women face many of the same physical and psychological difficulties of spaceflight as men. Scientific studies generally show no particular adverse effect from short space missions. It has even been suggested by some that women might be better suited for longer space missions. Studies have continually indicated that the main obstacle for women to go to space remains gender discrimination.

== History ==
=== Early Space Race struggle ===
In the competition between the Soviet Union (USSR) and the United States known as the Space Race, both nations chose their first space pilots (known as cosmonauts in the USSR and astronauts in the US) in the late 1950s and early 1960s from the ranks of their military high-speed jet test pilots, who were exclusively men.

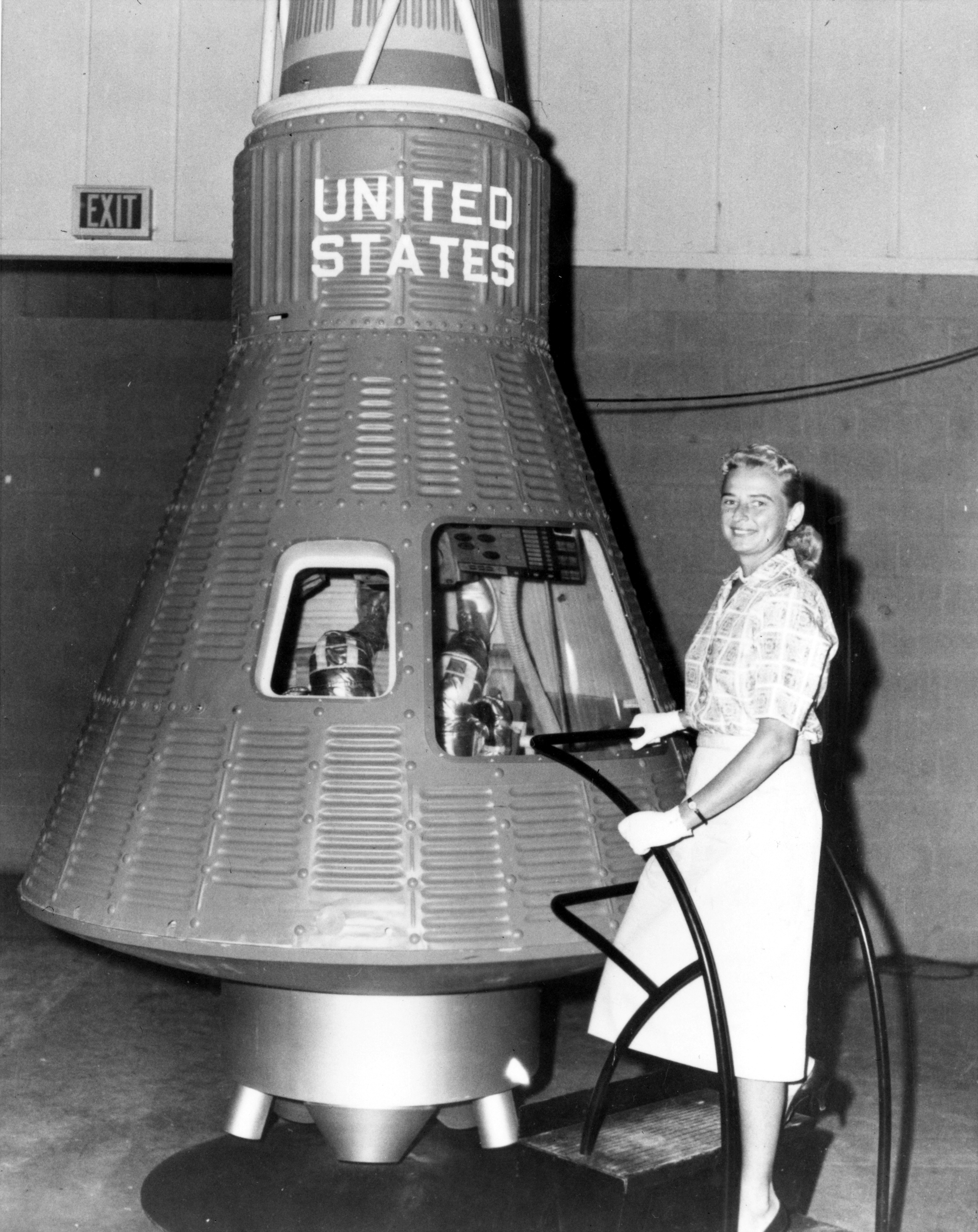
Jerrie Cobb with a Mercury capsule (c. early 1960s)

In 1959, after their research project Woman in Space Earliest of the Air Force Air Research and Development Command was not permitted, Don Flickinger and William Randolph Lovelace II subsequently formed a group of thirteen women US pilots, dubbed by the American press as the "Mercury 13". The women took and passed the same health screening tests as the men, supervised by Lovelace Clinic staff. This was funded privately (e.g. by aviation pioneer Jacqueline Cochran) and not by the government; the idea of female astronauts faced a great deal of resistance in the military command and NASA, leaving these women no chance of becoming astronauts. Jerrie Cobb of the "Mercury 13" became a consultant to NASA in 1961 and testified before Congress in July 1962 about the "Mercury 13"'s positive medical results and gender discrimination.

Meanwhile, the USSR's director of cosmonaut training, Nikolai Kamanin, lobbied for women as cosmonauts, after being inspired in 1961 by repeated questions from the foreign press about women in space. Kamanin crucially gained space program leader Sergey Korolev's support, getting approval six months later for women cosmonauts. During a visit to the US in 1962 Kamanin got to know Jerrie Cobb of the then rejected "Mercury 13". Kamanin noted in his diary, "We cannot allow that the first woman in space will be American. This would be an insult to the patriotic feelings of Soviet women." The Soviet government generally had no interest in women as cosmonaut pilots, but Premier Nikita Khrushchev was interested in the propaganda value of Soviet superiority over the US in women's equality. In February 1962 a group of five female cosmonauts from over 400 applicants were chosen to be trained for a solo spaceflight in a Vostok spacecraft. To increase the odds of sending a Soviet woman into space first, the women cosmonauts began their training before the men.

==== First Woman in Space ====
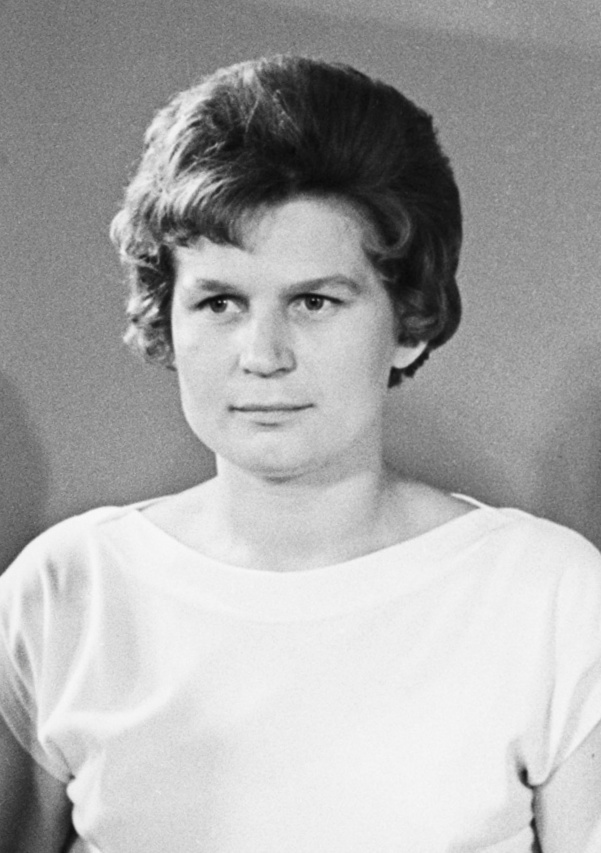
Valentina Tereshkova was the first woman in space, in 1963 aboard Vostok 6

The first woman to fly in space was Valentina Tereshkova, a textile factory worker who was an avid amateur parachutist. Parachuting was necessary for the Earth landing which was made outside the reentry capsule. Tereshkova flew aboard Vostok 6 on June 16, 1963, completing a 70.8 hour flight making 48 orbits of Earth.

Kamanin framed her as "Gagarin in a skirt". Tereshkova married Vostok 3 cosmonaut Andriyan Nikolayev on November 3, 1963, at the Moscow Wedding Palace, with Khrushchev presiding at the wedding party together with government and space program leaders. Kamanin said it was "probably useful for politics and science". Tereshkova gave birth to their daughter on 8 June 1964, the first person with both a mother and father who had traveled into space.

==== Further female missions cancelled ====
Kamanin hoped to fly two other women on the Voskhod 3 and 4 flights, despite the opposition of Yuri Gagarin and the other male cosmonauts. These plans were canceled in 1965, leaving the women with Soviet Air Force officer commissions.

The American Apollo program to land a man on the Moon included only male astronauts. Neither the USSR nor US launched another woman into space until women were admitted to the astronaut and cosmonaut corps in the late 1970s.

=== Later Space Race advances ===
By 1971 NASA had hired staff to address adherence to legal requirements to include underrepresented people of society. Star Trek star Nichelle Nichols was hired to assist after she spoke at the National Space Institute for the inclusion of women and minorities as astronauts.

On January 16, 1978, NASA announced Astronaut Group 8 including people of minorities, and six women: Mission specialists Anna L. Fisher, Shannon Lucid, Judith A. Resnik, Sally K. Ride, Margaret Rhea Seddon, and Kathryn D. Sullivan.

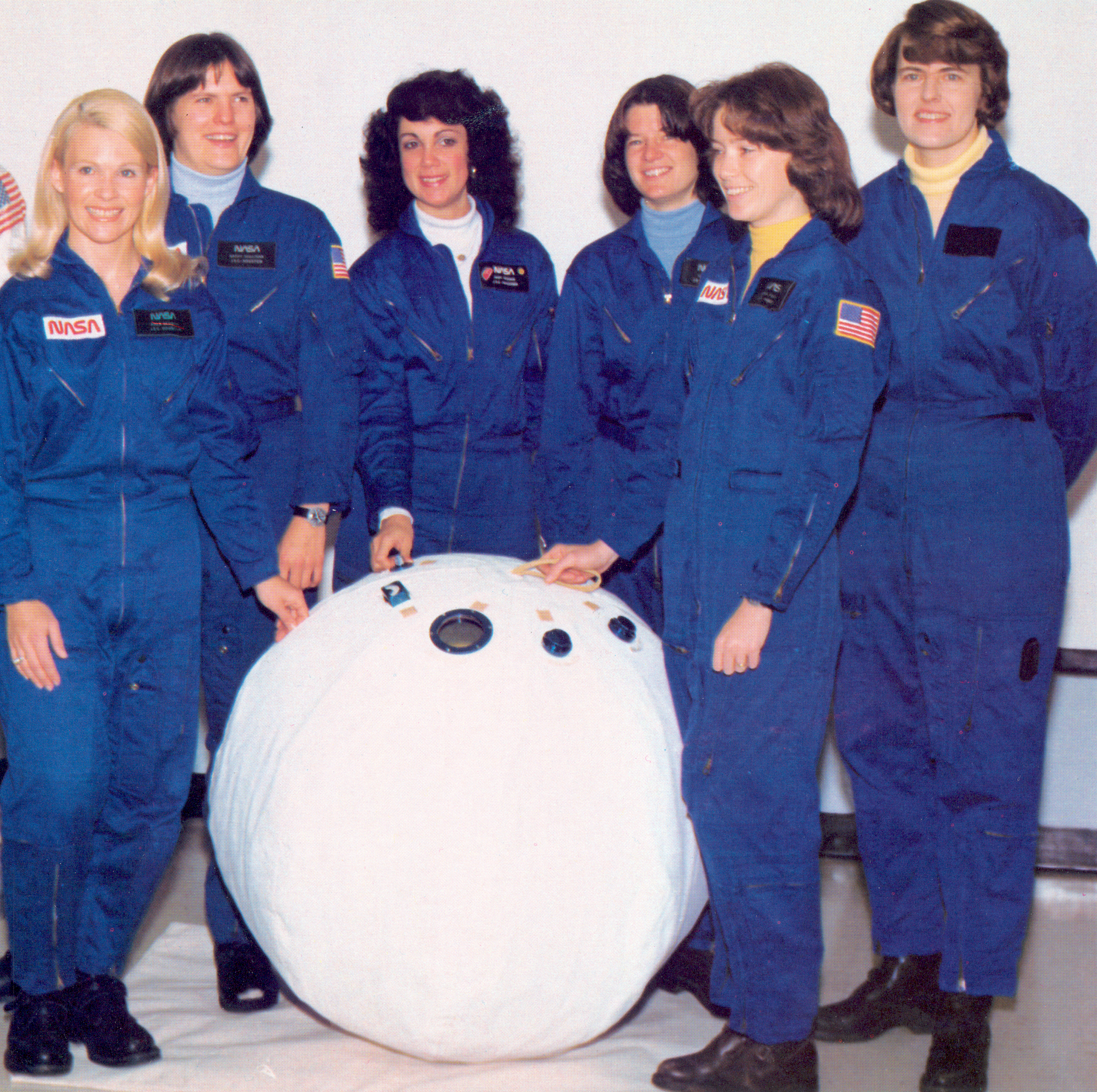
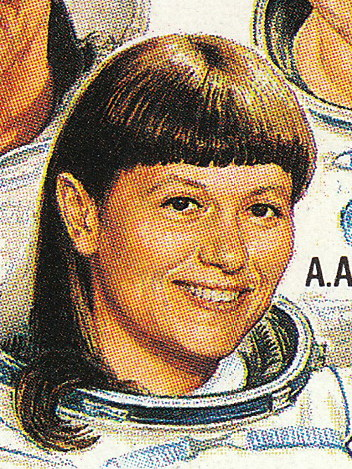
Left: NASA's first six women astronauts chosen in the 1970s: Seddon, Sullivan, Resnik, Ride, Fisher, and Lucid.
Right: Svetlana Savitskaya the second woman in space (1982), first to return to space, and the first to conduct an EVA (1984).

Similarly, in 1978 Tereshkova and her colleague Tatyana Kuznetsova pushed for women in the cosmonaut program, with the USSR in July 1980 assembling a cosmonaut group of nine women and four men. The women were: Svetlana Savitskaya, Galina Amelkina, Yelena Dobrokvashina, Larisa Pozharskaya, Tamara Zakharova, Yekaterina Ivanova, Natalya Kuleshova, Irina Pronina, and Irina Latysheva.

Of the nine only Savitskaya went to space. She flew as a research cosmonaut aboard the Soyuz T-7 to the space station Salyut 7 in August 1982. She became the first woman to go to space twice, on the Soyuz T-12 mission on July 25, 1984 and on that mission became the first woman to conduct extravehicular activity.

All the women of NASA's Astronaut Group 8 flew in space at least once, with mission specialist Sally Ride becoming the first US woman in space on the 1983 seventh Space Shuttle mission, and third woman overall in space.

=== After the Space Race ===
Since the final years of the Space Race most of the women who have been to space have been American women, outnumbering all other countries combined. But the more than 50 American women astronauts, contrasted by the several hundred astronauts who have entered space, women still only make up about 12% of all people who have gone to space, still being less chosen and enabled. NASA only in 2013 enabled the first time an equal number of women as part of an astronaut class, the NASA Astronaut Group 21, a short lived situation since the subsequently and current Group 22 has yet again a lower number.

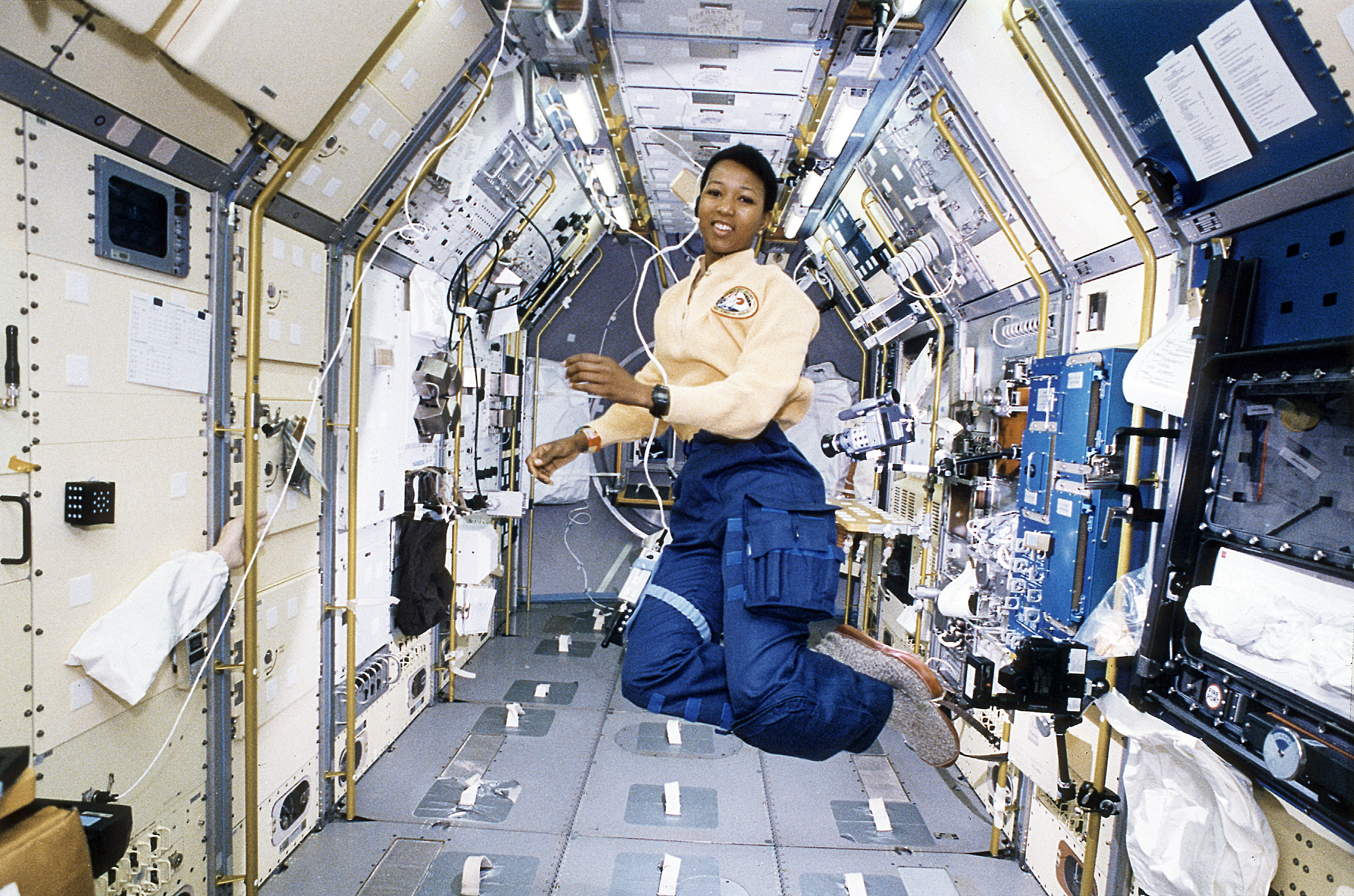
Mae Jemison, the first woman of color in space, aboard STS-47 in 1992

==== Advancements ====
In 1992 Mae Jemison became the first woman of color in space. Susan Helms became the first woman on an International Space Station expedition crew on Expedition 2, lasting from March 2001 until August 2001. In October 2007, Peggy Whitson became the first woman to command the ISS, and in October 2009 NASA's first female Chief of the Astronaut Office. On October 18, 2019, the first all female spacewalk was conducted by Jessica Meir and Christina Koch on the ISS. On April 6, 2026, during the Artemis II lunar flyby, Koch became the first woman to fly around the Moon, after becoming the first woman to travel beyond low Earth orbit four days earlier. From the vicinity of the Moon, she talked to her "space sister" and upcoming ISS commander Meir on the ISS, pointing out that with their colleagues that they set the record for the furthest two groups of humans.

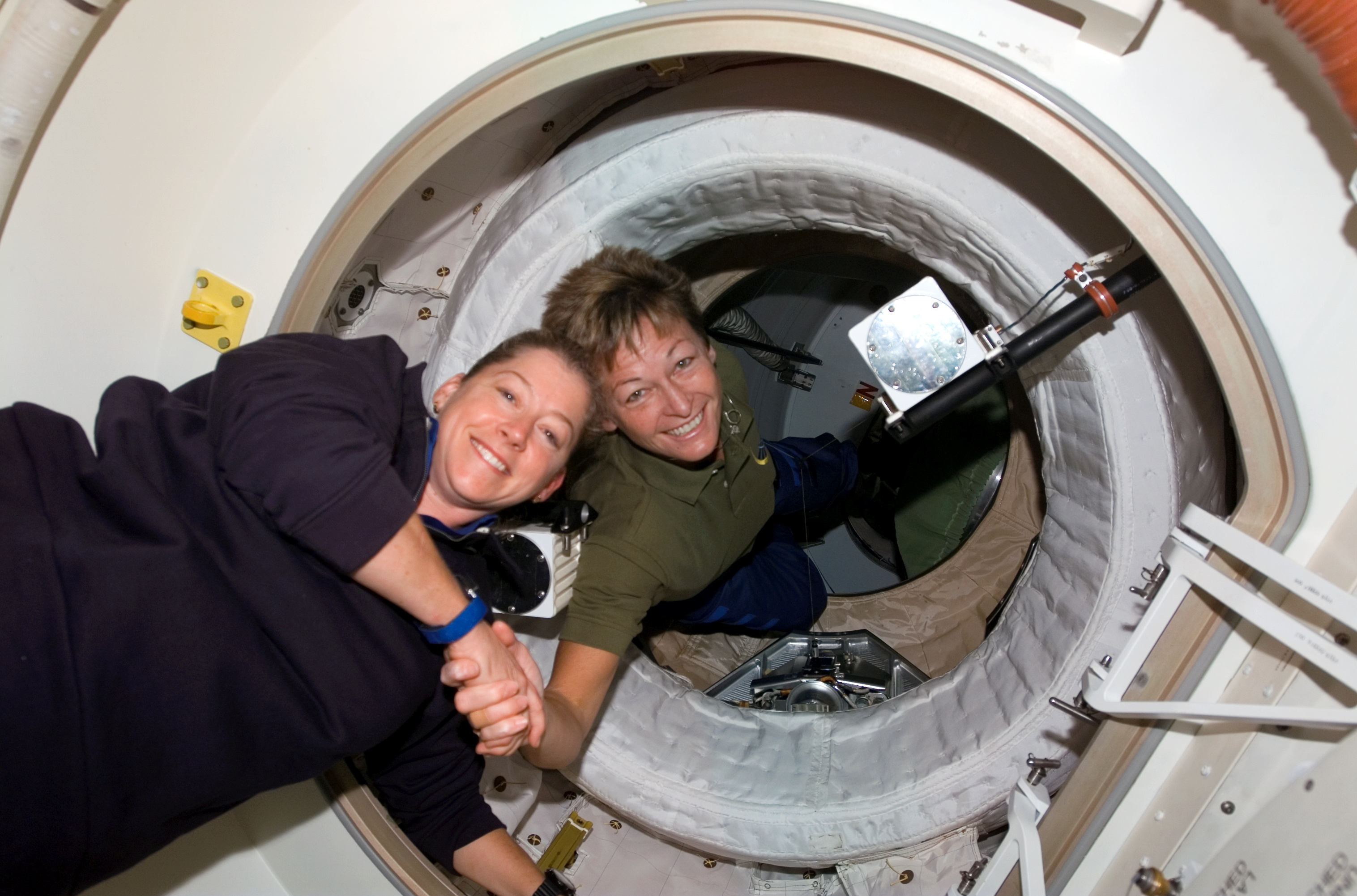
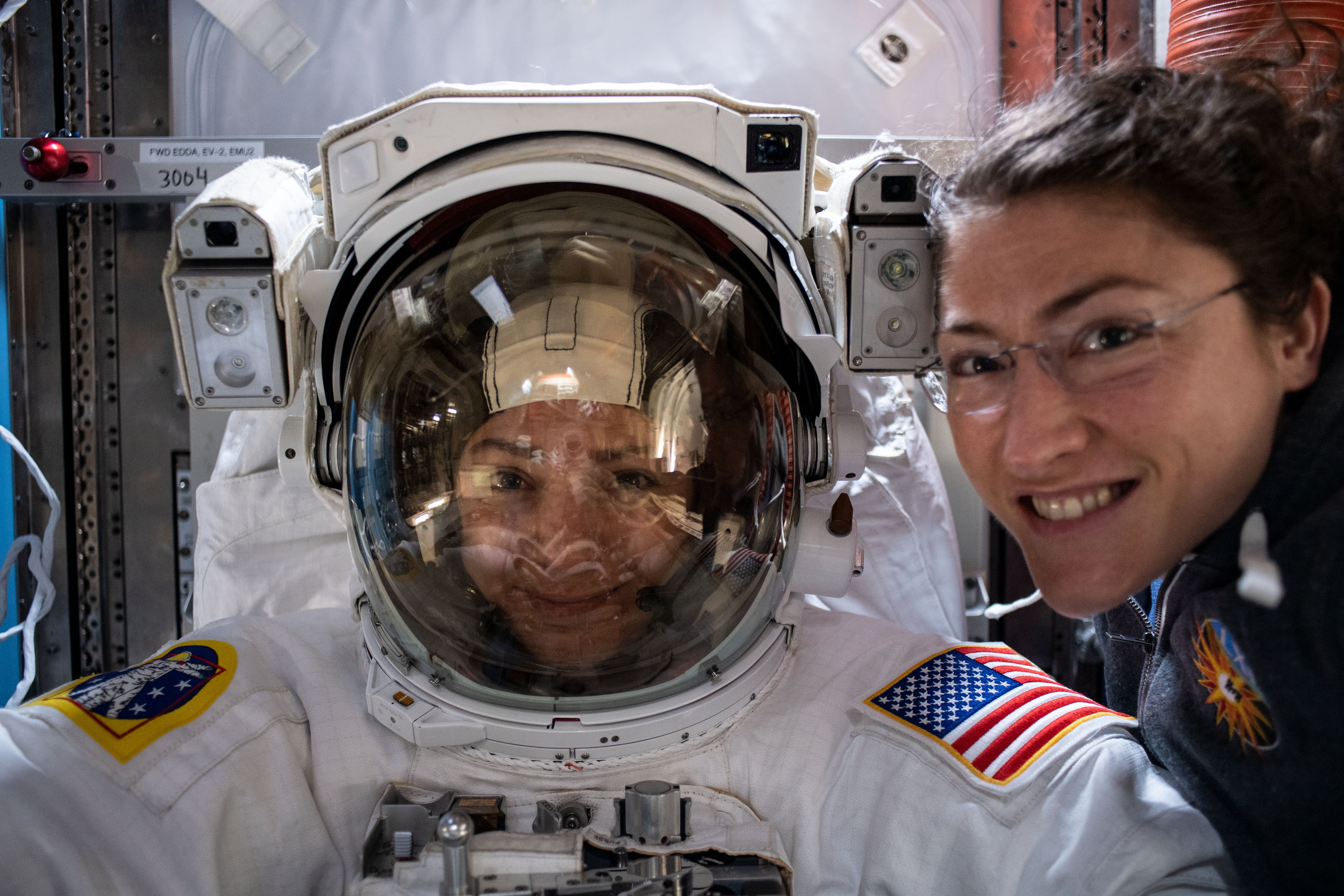
Left: In 2007, with America sending women into space more frequently Peggy Whitson (Expedition 16), the first woman captain of a space station, greeted, in a first of its kind encounter, another woman spacecraft captain (Pamela Melroy, STS-120).
Right: Jessica Meir with Christina Koch (right) of ISS Expedition 61 in 2019, before making the first all-woman spacewalk.

==== Future ====
Only 12 human beings, all American men, have walked on the Moon. In 2020, NASA's communication director reported that NASA planned to land astronauts on the Moon, including possibly a woman astronaut or astronauts, as part of the U.S. Artemis program. Of the 18 candidates in the Artemis program, nine are women: Nicole Aunapu Mann, Kayla Barron, Christina Koch, Kate Rubins, Stephanie Wilson, Jessica Meir, Jasmin Moghbeli, Anne McClain and Jessica Watkins. Furthermore, the European Space Agency (ESA) has six astronauts, of whom one is a woman (Samantha Cristoforetti), training for Artemis. This group is later to be joined by members of the 2022 European Space Agency Astronaut Group, which includes two women, (Sophie Adenot and Rosemary Coogan), plus history's first parastronaut.

== Discrimination ==
Space programs allowed women generally only well into the space age, with NASA opening its space program in 1976. When Sally Ride became the first female US astronaut to go into space in 1983, the press asked her questions about her reproductive organs and whether she would cry if things went wrong on the job.

Women with children have faced questions about how they would compare to traditional expectations of motherhood. Shannon Lucid, one of the first group of female US astronauts, remembers questions by the press on how her children would handle her being a mother in space. Women are often expected to be the ones mainly responsible for child-rearing, which can impact their career.

According to the historian Kim McQuaid the American space agency NASA ignored gender issues at the beginning of the space era, and women were not normally allowed to enter technical schools or undergraduate/graduate training in engineering and the physical sciences until changes started happening in the end of the 1960s. Particularly in the period between 1972 and 1974 the focus on women became more prominent. In 1967, NASA changed its policy to make it easier for women to join and 17 women applied for the role to join a space travel mission, but all 17 job applications were declined. NASA did employ thousands of women in jobs where space travel was not included in the 1960s, but there was still hierarchical differences between women and men. The women employed in the space agency NASA are still more likely to work in lower-ranked jobs, while men are more often employed in higher-ranked occupations, particularly in space crew settings, despite women having similar qualifications to those of men. There has also been found a larger gender gap in certain jobs such as manufacturing, while downstream application and service jobs have a higher representation of women employees.

In 2023, numbers released by UNOOSA showed that only 11 percent of the world's astronauts are women, 6.6 percent are spacewalkers and 20 percent are in the space workforce. In March 2023, the Director of Space Technology of the Australian Space Agency, Katherine Bennell-Pegg, said that women are still in the minority in the space industry and that "STEM is for everyone", adding that inclusivity is important. The UN Sustainable Development Goals suggests that an increase of women being involved in the space industry is important to achieve the SDGs and gender equality, since 90 percent of future jobs will probably require STEM related skills. The promotion of space technology in an inclusive manner is an important step towards achieving the SDG 5B. In 2022, the American astronaut Nicole Aunapu Mann, who studied mechanical engineering at Stanford University and has military combat background in Iraq and Afghanistan, became the first Native American woman in space on her mission to the International Space Station. On the 2023 International Women's Day, Mann stated that "inequality does stifle success" and that it is important to continue to break barriers and inspire and empower the youth to achieve their dreams.

In 1995, an academic journal stated that outer space occupations was regarded as a male dominated arena where the male body was the standard while the female body was seen as 'contamination' or uncertainty in an otherwise stable environment, and women have said that they have struggled to be taken seriously in outer space environments. Some women in the space industry have reported feeling they have to express typically masculine traits like assertiveness and dominance, since 'feminine' traits are looked down upon. For example, men are thought to be more rational, which is beneficial in the space industry, while femininity is associated with being emotional which is viewed as 'negative' in the context of outer space travel. The American scientist and former government official Carloyn Huntoon said in an interview in 2002 that if the women did not behave in the same way as the guys, it would mean that they were not doing the job properly.

Chris Pesterfield, a lecturer at the University of Bristol, stated that legal and political changes have been made to allow for women in outer space occupations, but that these changes have not been as effective as expected. Pesterfield argued that the unequal number of women and men in space might be due to socialisation starting already in child years. For example, boys are more often encouraged to have interests in STEM subjects such as technology and science than girls, and there may be societal expectations that gender will influence what a person is good at. The OECD found that the majority of women employed by NASA have studied biological sciences (48 percent), while they are underrepresented in mathematics (25 percent), physical sciences (25 percent) and engineering (22 percent). Rebecca Spyke Keiser, who is a special assistant to the NASA administrator for innovation and public-private partnership, has stated that the lack of woman role models in aerospace and physics might also have contributed to the low number of women in space-related work as well as perceptions about women only being good at certain things.

There have been attempts at combating gender discrimination within the space sector. For example, the United Nations has made the Space4Women project which is intended to focus on gender related issues in space and find reasons why gender inequality is still an issue in the outer space sector. The project includes women from different backgrounds, professions and countries. One of the mentees in the programme stated that "working for girls and women in science has been empowering, encouraging me to persist in a work environment that is sometimes so hostile and not inclusive". In October 2017, UNOOSA and UN women also cooperated to organise a 'Space for Women' Expert Meeting with the goal of empowering women in space industry jobs. Commercial spaceflight and more focus on diversity are also factors that play a role in boosting participation by women.

== Physical effects of space on women ==
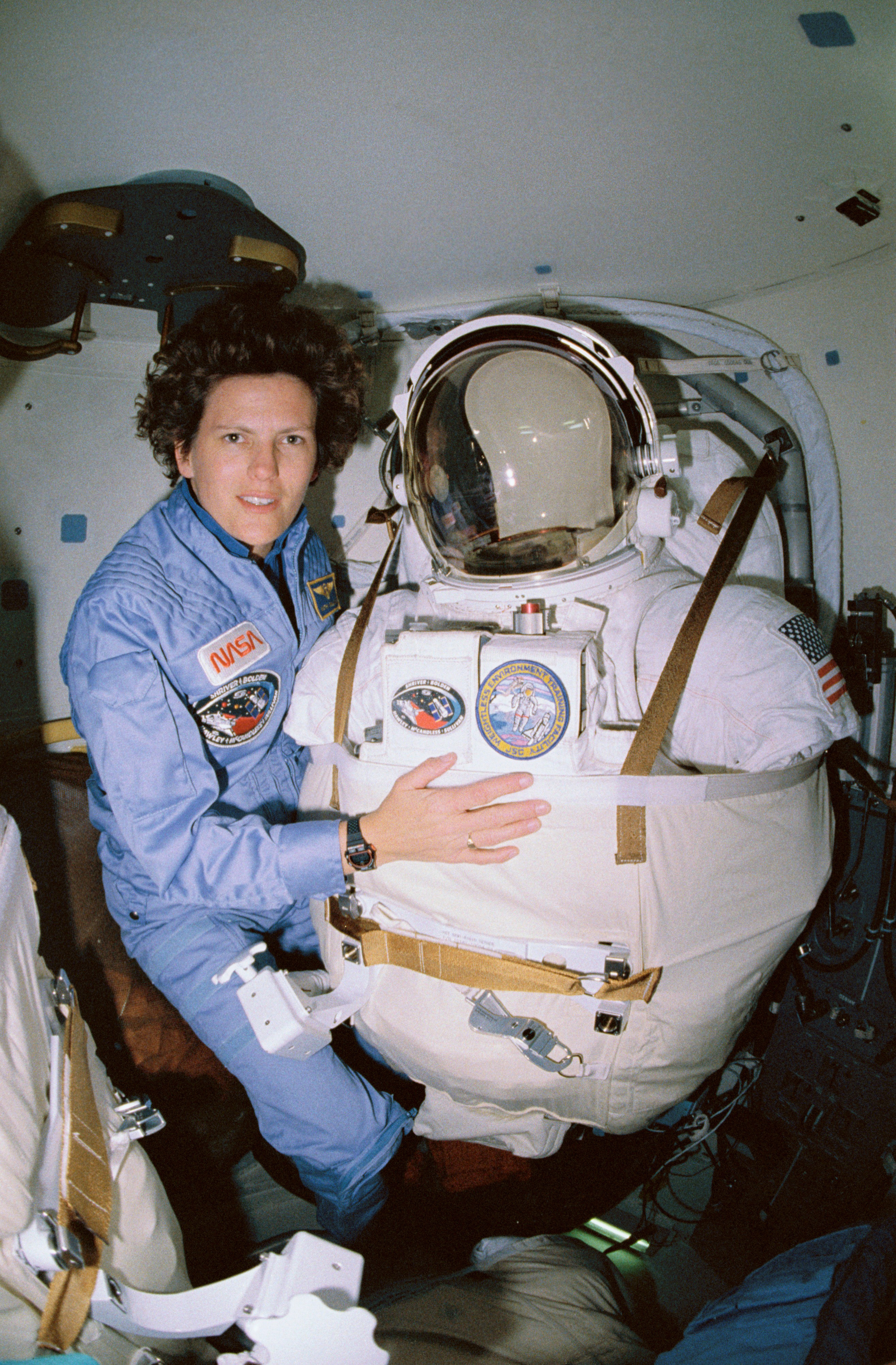
Kathryn D. Sullivan poses for a picture before donning her space suit and extravehicular mobility unit in the airlock on board the April 25, 1990 Space Shuttle mission that deployed the Hubble Space Telescope.

Female astronauts are subject to the same general physical effects of space travel as male astronauts. These include physiological changes due to weightlessness such as loss of bone and muscle mass, health threats from cosmic rays, dangers due to vacuum and temperature, and psychological stress.

NASA reports initially argued that menstruation could pose serious health risks or have a negative effect on performance, although it is now dealt with as a matter of routine.

Since women have been sent to space, the previously male focused clothing has been reconsidered addressing the issues and needs for clothing like space suits for extravehicular activity (EVA) and bras, e.g. for exercise in micro-g environments.

Furthermore, space toilet designs did not have women in mind, until October 2020 when the first toilet with better design for women (as well as men) was delivered to the ISS.

=== Radiation and uterine and breast cancer ===
Both men and women are affected by radiation. Massive particles are a concern for astronauts outside the Earth's magnetic field who receive solar particles from solar proton events (SPE) and galactic cosmic rays from cosmic sources. These high-energy charged nuclei are blocked by Earth's magnetic field but pose a major health concern for astronauts traveling to the Moon and to any distant location beyond Earth orbit. Evidence indicates past solar particle event (SPE) radiation levels that would have been lethal for unprotected astronauts.

However, due to the currently used risk models for endometrial, ovarian and breast cancer, women at NASA can currently only spend half as much time on missions as men, which limits their career options compared to men.

Astronauts on Apollo and Skylab missions received on average 1.2 mSv/day and 1.4 mSv/day respectively. Exposures on the ISS average 0.4 mSv per day (150 mSv per year), although frequent crew rotations minimize risk to individuals. A trip to Mars with current technology might be related to measurements by the Mars Science Laboratory which for a 180-day journey estimated an exposure approximately 300 mSv, which would be equivalent of 24 CAT scans or "15 times an annual radiation limit for a worker in a nuclear power plant".

=== Fertility ===
A study published in 2005 in the International Journal of Impotence Research reported that short-duration missions (no longer than nine days) did not affect "the ability of astronauts to conceive and bear healthy children to term." In another experiment, the frog Xenopus laevis successfully ovulated in space.

Astronauts Valentina Tereshkova (the first woman in space) and Andriyan Nikolayev became the first married astronauts and the first having a child after both being in space.

=== Pregnancy ===
NASA has not permitted pregnant astronauts to fly in space, and there have been no pregnant women in space. However, various science experiments have dealt with some aspects of pregnancy.

For air travel, the United States' Federal Aviation Administration recommends a limit of 1 mSv total for a pregnancy, and no more than 0.5 mSv per month.

For fetus radiation increases the risk of childhood cancers. Additionally children of female astronauts could be sterile if the astronaut were exposed to too much ionizing radiation during the later stages of a pregnancy. Ionizing radiation may destroy the egg cells of a female fetus inside a pregnant woman, rendering the offspring infertile even when grown.

While no human had gestated in space as of 2025, scientists have conducted experiments on non-human mammalian gestation. Space missions that have studied "reproducing and growing mammals" include Kosmos 1129 and 1154, as the Shuttle missions STS-66, 70, 72, and 90. A Soviet experiment in 1983 showed that a rat that orbited while pregnant later gave birth to healthy babies; the babies were "thinner and weaker than their Earth-based counterparts and lagged behind a bit in their mental development," although the developing pups eventually caught up.

The lack of knowledge about pregnancy and birth control in micro-gravity has been noted in regards to conducting long-term space missions.

==== Post-natal ====
A 1998 Space Shuttle mission showed that rodent Rattus mothers were either not producing enough milk or not feeding their offspring in space. However, a later study on pregnant rats showed that the animals successfully gave birth and lactated normally.

Anna Lee Fisher was in 1984 the first biological mother going into space.

To date no human children have been born in space; neither have children gone into space. Nevertheless, the idea of children in space is taken seriously enough that some have discussed how to raise children in space.

== Fatalities ==
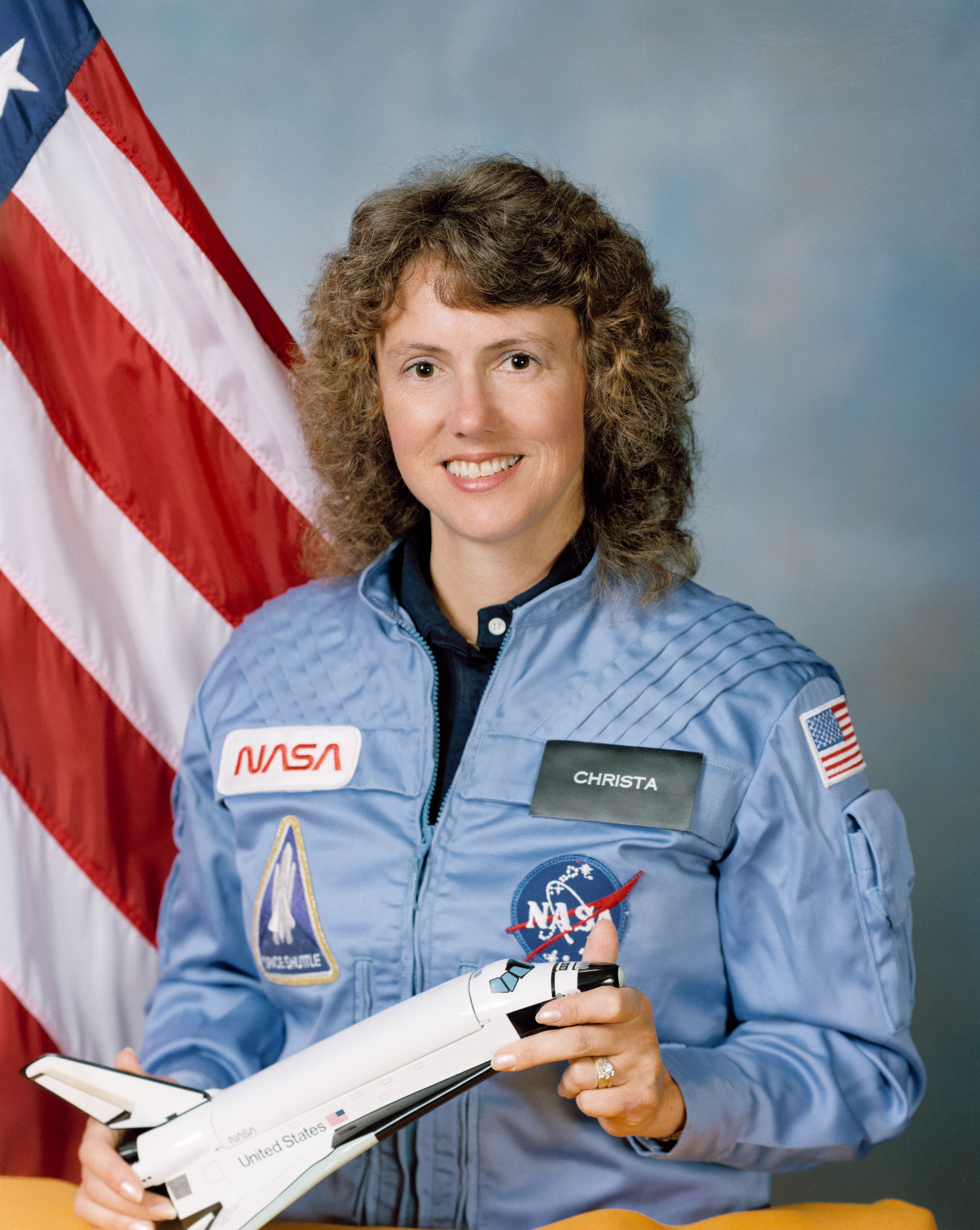
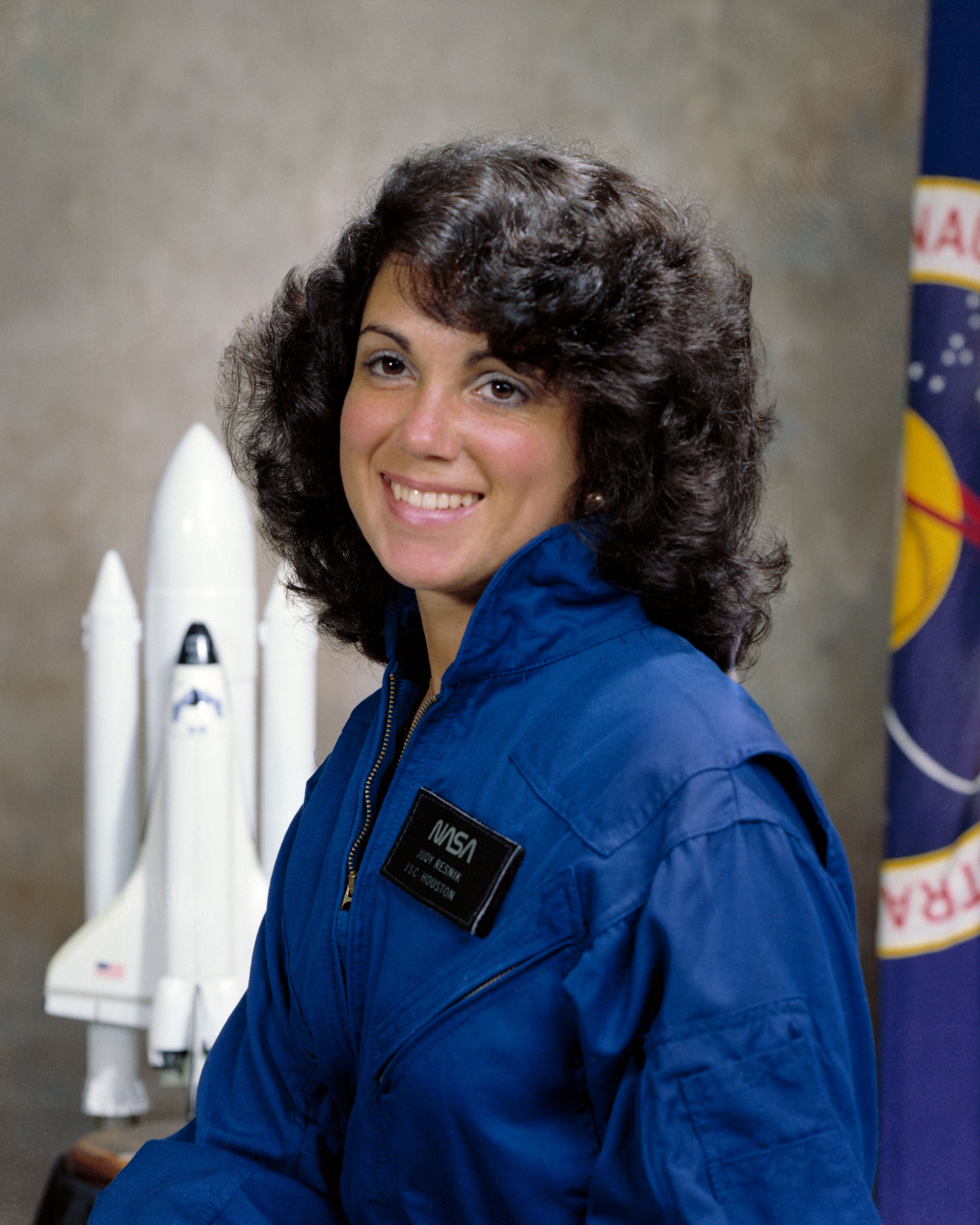
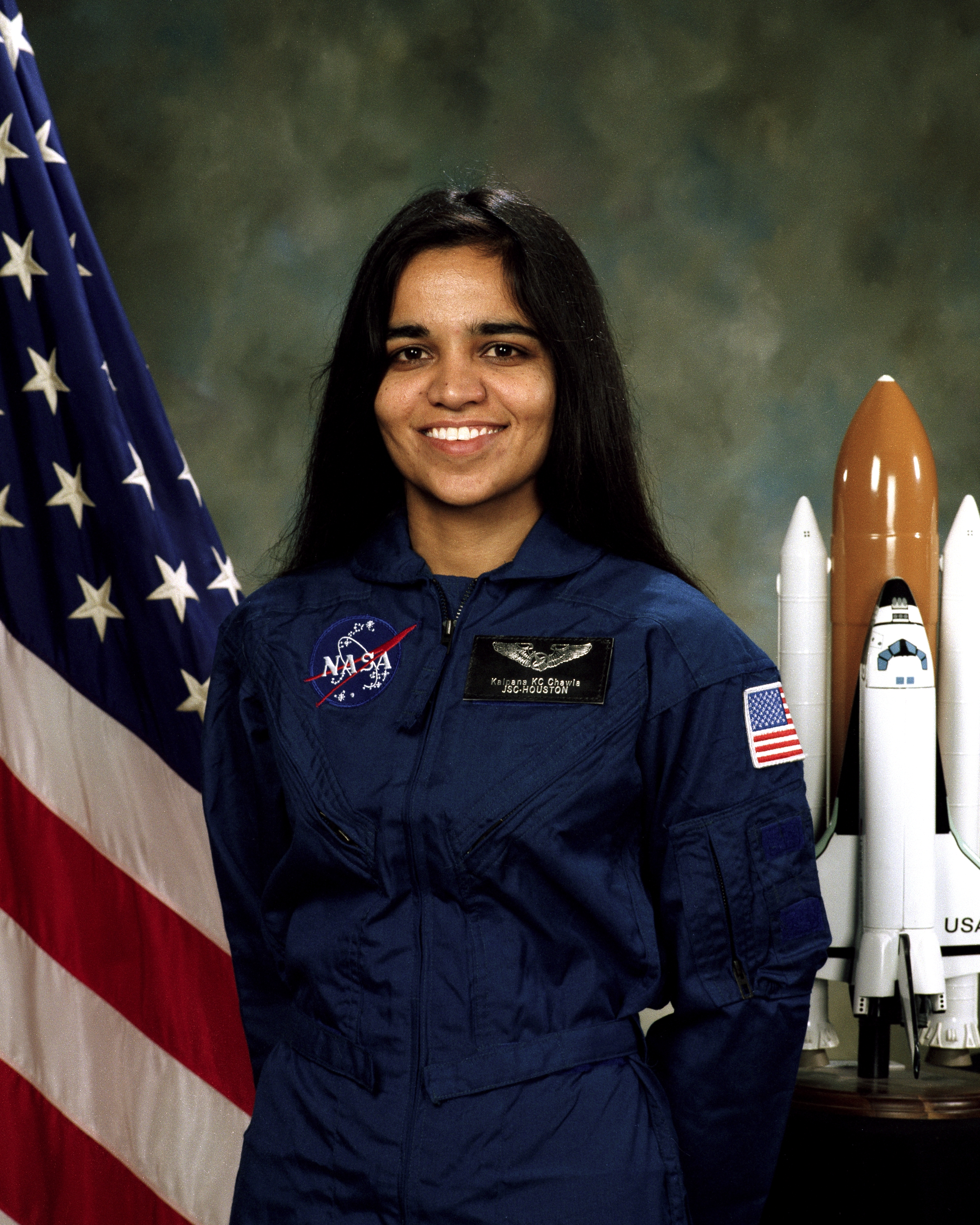
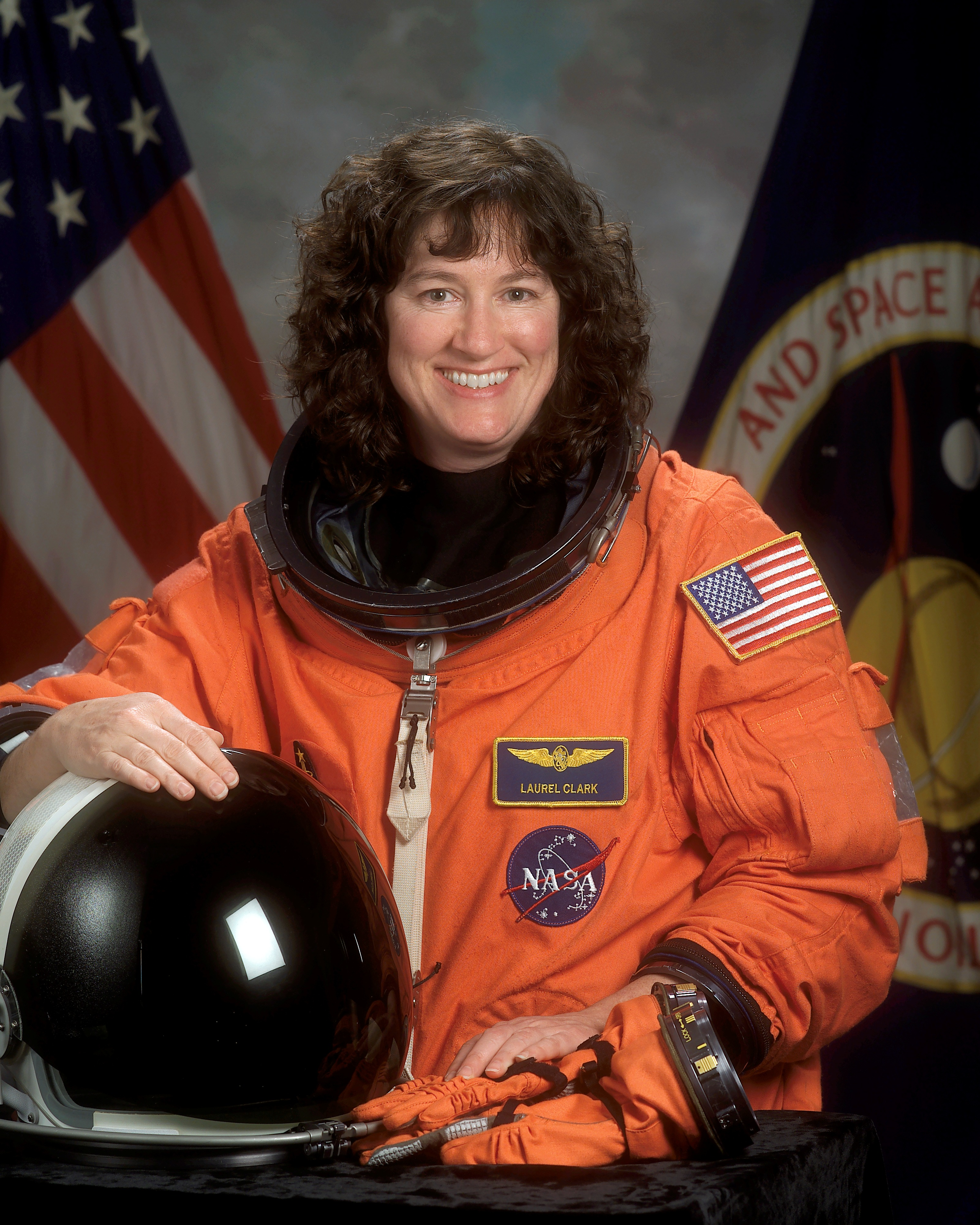
Top: Christa McAuliffe and Judith A. Resnik died in the January 28, 1986 Challenger disaster, along with the entire STS-51-L crew.
Bottom: Kalpana Chawla and Laurel Clark died in the February 1, 2003 Columbia disaster, along with the entire STS-107 crew.

Four women have died during two spaceflight missions that occurred 1986 and 2003.

The first Teacher in Space Project (TISP) participant as payload specialist Christa McAuliffe, along with mission specialist Judith Resnik of STS-51-L died when their Space Shuttle Challenger exploded on January 28, 1986, less than two minutes after launch, along with all of their crewmates.

In February 2003, mission specialists Kalpana Chawla and Laurel Clark were among those killed on re-entry in the Space Shuttle Columbia disaster.

== Statistics ==
Men (blue) and women (red) in space by nationality (as of April 2025)
United States	319♂ 60♀️ ---
Soviet Union	70♂ 2♀️ ---
Russia	52♂ 4♀️ ---
China^{3}	26♂ 4♀️ ---
Japan	12♂ 2♀️ ---
Germany^{1,2}	12♂ 1♀️ ---
France^{1}	9♂ 2♀️ ---
Canada	9♂ 2♀️ ---
Italy^{1}	8♂ 1♀️ ---
Other countries	45♂ 4♀️ ---
All countries	560♂ 82♀️ ---

NASA astronaut Christina Koch holds the record for the longest single spaceflight by a woman (328 days), returning on February 6, 2020. During Expedition 61, she surpassed NASA astronaut Peggy Whitson's 289 days from 2016 to 2017.

== By public space program ==
=== USA ===
The US has hosted women to fly to space since 1983. Since then it has hosted more women then all other countries combined. After the worldwide first crewed space flights in 1961 and the first flight of a woman in 1963, women in the US, like the Mercury 13, have been campaigning to be included to fly.

Sally Ride became the first American woman in space, when she flew in June 1983 on the Space Shuttle mission STS-7 to space.

The first US woman to perform Extravehicular activity (EVA) was Kathryn D. Sullivan on the STS-41-G, which launched on October 11, 1984.

NASA's first female pilot was Eileen Collins from group 13, who first flew in February 1995 on STS-63 and became the first female US mission commander in July 1999 on STS-93.

Although not a NASA astronaut, Millie Hughes-Fulford of the U.S. Department of Veterans Affairs flew on the STS-40 Space Shuttle mission in June 1991 as the first female payload specialist from outside the space agency.

In April 2026 Christina Koch became the first woman to journey into deep space and conduct a lunar flyby as part of the Artemis II mission to the moon. In October 2019 participated in the first all-female spacewalk and earlier set the record for spending the most time on a spaceflight than any other woman before, 328 days.

=== Russia ===
Russia's Roscosmos has sent three women since it inherited in 1991 the Soviet space program, which had sent two women, both Russian, including the very first women altogether to space.

Originally chosen as the third Soviet woman to go to space, Yelena V. Kondakova became the first woman cosmonaut for the Russian Federation in 1994, and the first woman to travel for both the Soyuz program and on the Space Shuttle. Twenty years later, Yelena Serova became the first Russian woman cosmonaut to visit the International Space Station on September 26, 2014.

Actress Yulia Peresild became 2021 the fourth Russian woman flying to space. Though she was not sent by the Russian state, since she flew as Spaceflight participant, shooting scenes for a Russian movie at the ISS.

Russia's only current woman cosmonaut, Anna Kikina, was admitted to the Russian cosmonaut corps in 2012. In 2019 Roscosmos announced changes to their space suits to accommodate women and announced in 2020 that Kikina was selected for a flight to the International Space Station in 2022, with SpaceX Crew-5.

==== Participants ====
Yulia Peresild became in 2021 the first Russian non-professional and spaceflight participant.

=== Canada ===
Canada has sent two women to space.

Roberta Bondar was the first Canadian woman to fly in space, on the Space Shuttle Discovery in January 1992.

The second Canadian woman astronaut is Julie Payette from Montreal. Payette was part of the crew of STS-96, on the Space Shuttle Discovery from May 27 to June 6, 1999. During the mission, the crew performed the first manual docking of the Shuttle to the International Space Station, and delivered four tons of logistics and supplies to the station. On Endeavour in 2009 for STS-127, Payette served as a mission specialist. Her main responsibility was to operate the Canadarm robotic arm from the space station. Payette was sworn in as the 29th Governor General of Canada on October 2, 2017.

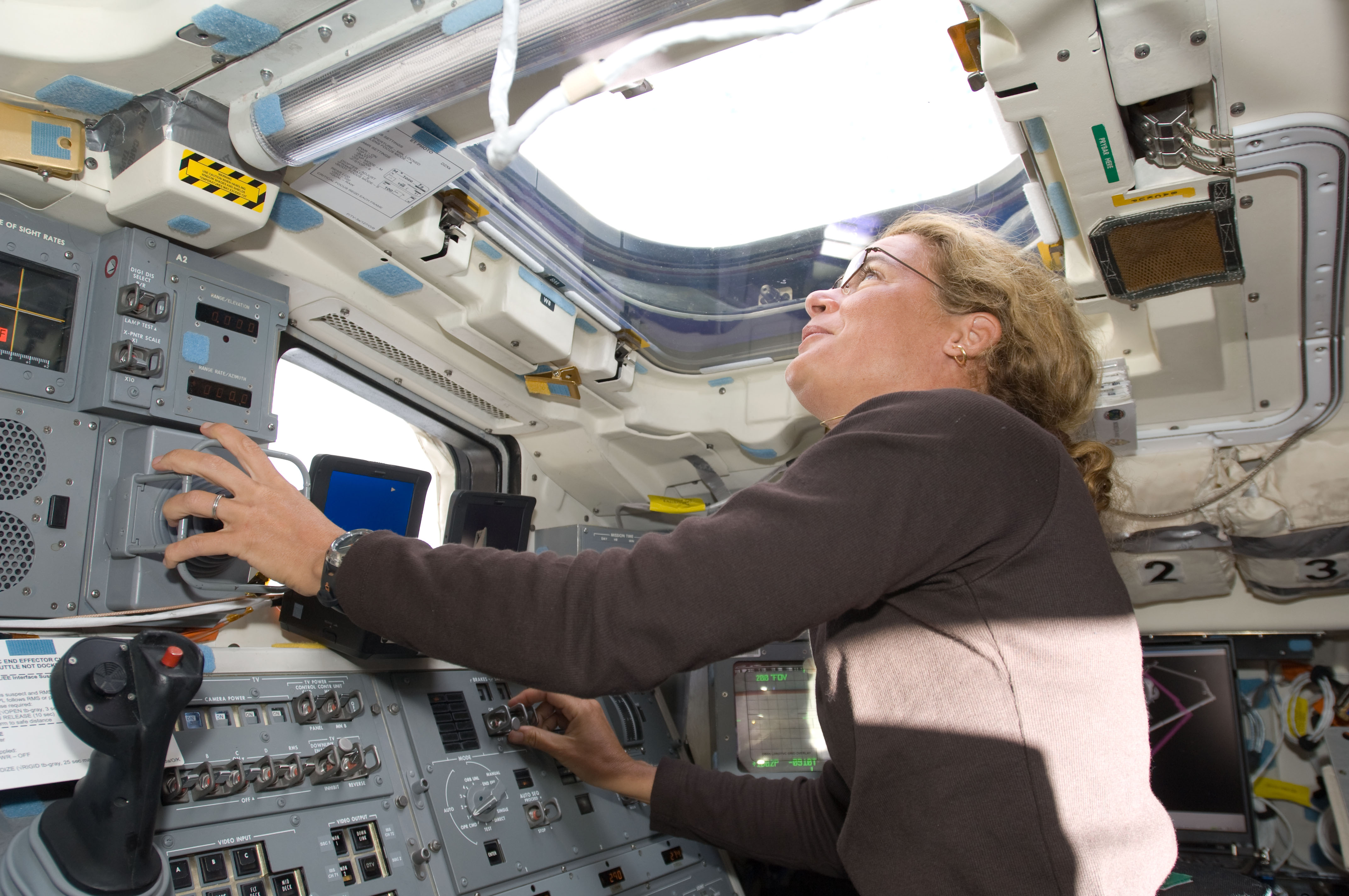
Canadian astronaut Julie Payette in space in 2009 (STS-127)

In July 2017, Dr. Jennifer Sidey-Gibbons was selected by the Canadian Space Agency to receive astronaut training at Johnson Space Center. She completed the two-year Astronaut Candidate Training Program and obtained the official title of astronaut in January 2020. She has been assigned as the backup for Jeremy Hansen for Artemis II.

=== Japan ===
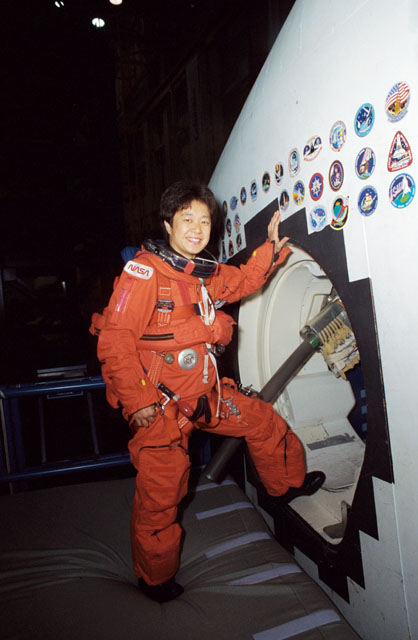
Chiaki Mukai at her training.

Japan's JAXA has sent two women to space.

In 1985, Chiaki Mukai was selected as one of three Japanese Payload Specialist candidates for the First Material Processing Test (Spacelab-J) that flew aboard STS-47 in 1992. She also served as a back-up payload specialist for the Neurolab (STS-90) mission. Mukai has logged over 566 hours in space. She flew aboard STS-65 in 1994 and STS-95 in 1998. She is the first Japanese and Asian woman to fly in space, and the first Japanese citizen to fly twice.

Naoko Yamazaki became the second Japanese woman to fly into space with her launch on April 5, 2010. Yamazaki entered space on the shuttle Discovery as part of mission STS-131. She returned to Earth on April 20, 2010. Yamazaki worked on ISS hardware development projects in the 1990s. She is an aerospace engineer and also holds a master's degree in that field. She was selected for astronaut training in 1999 and was certified by 2001. She was a mission specialist on her 2010 space shuttle flight, and spent 362 hours in space. Yamazaki worked on robotics and transitioned through the reorganization of Japanese spaceflight organization in 2003 when NASDA (National Space Development Agency) merged with ISAS (Institute of Space and Astronautical Science) and NAL (National Aerospace Laboratory of Japan). The new organization was called JAXA (Japan Aerospace Exploration Agency).

=== European Space Agency (ESA) ===
European Space Agency (ESA) sent the first time a woman to space in 1996 (second after 1991 privately funded Helen Sharman from Europe other than Russia, fifth including from Russia, seventh from any country other than the USA, and 31st overall). It has sent as of 2026 three women altogether, while it has sent many more men.

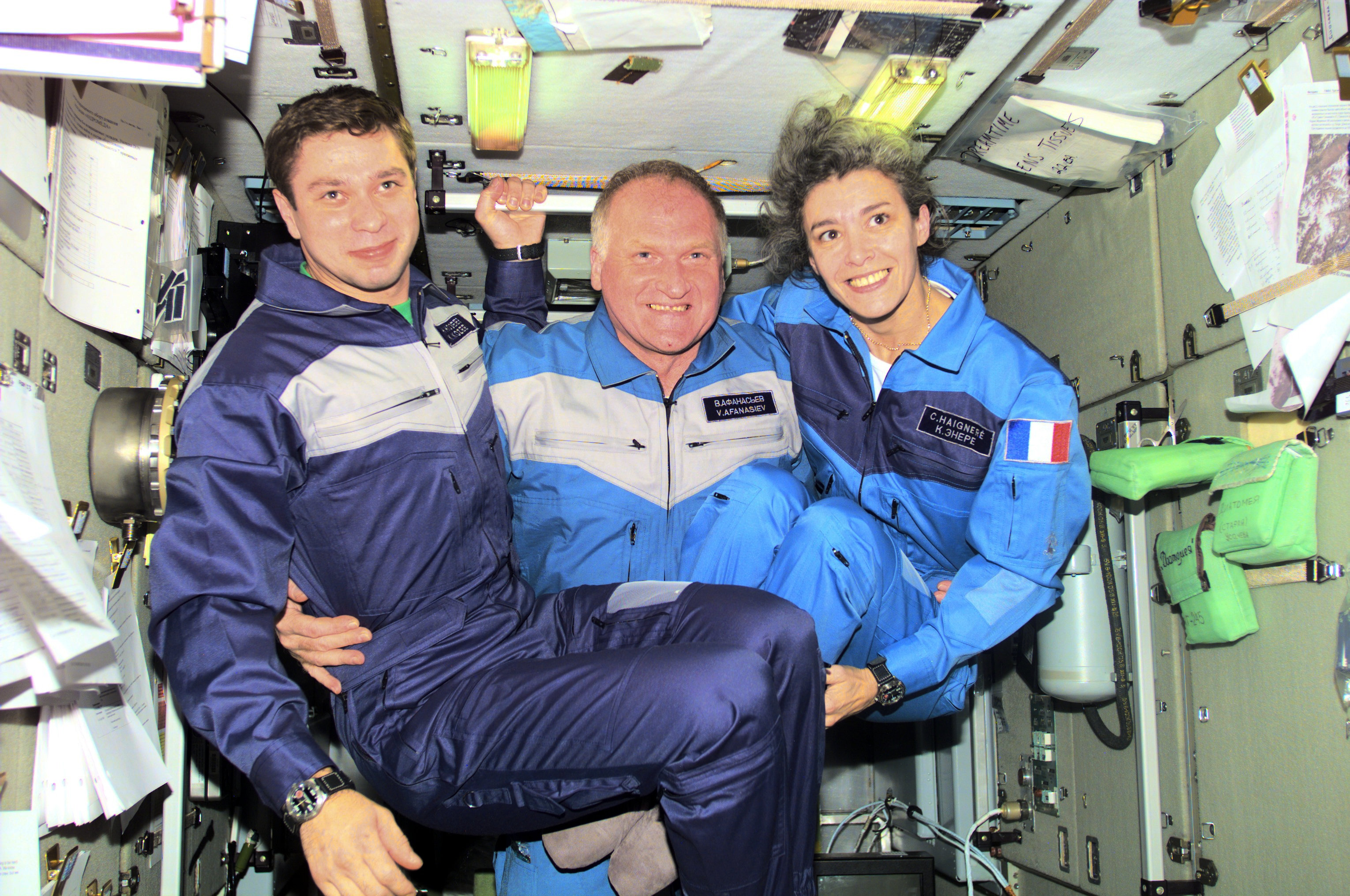
Claudie Haigneré (right), the first woman sent by ESA, as well as France and its state space agency CNES, aboard the International Space Station, during her second spaceflight (2001).

The first woman sent by ESA, as well as France and its state space agency CNES, was Claudie Haigneré, who went to the Russian space station Mir in 1996. She flew again in 2001 as the first European woman to visit the International Space Station.

Then in November 2014 the first Italian (Italian Space Agency) woman followed, when Samantha Cristoforetti launched to space with Soyuz TMA-15M. She returned to space in April 2021 on the SpaceX Crew-4 mission to the International Space Station.

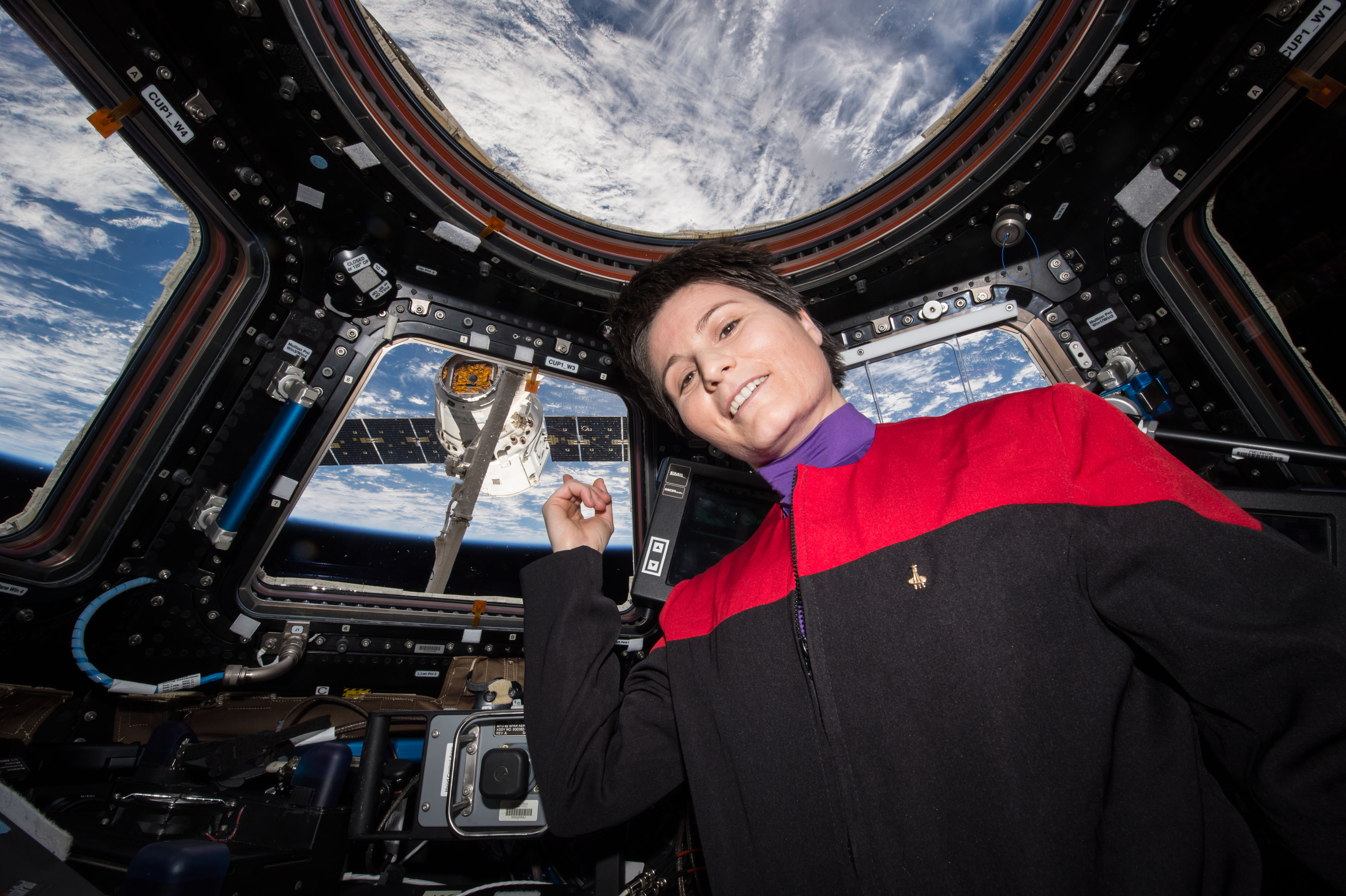
Cristoforetti in the ISS Cupola with a view of SpaceX CRS-6 bringing supplies, and dressed up in a Star Trek uniform, referencing Star Trek: Voyager

The 2022 European Space Agency Astronaut Group had specifically invited women to join. They also extended the first invitation to people with disabilities (parastronauts) to apply for the group. Of the selected five career astronauts and one para-astronaut two are women: Sophie Adenot and Rosemary Coogan.

Sophia Adenot became in 2026 the third woman being an ESA astronaut to go to space.

=== China ===
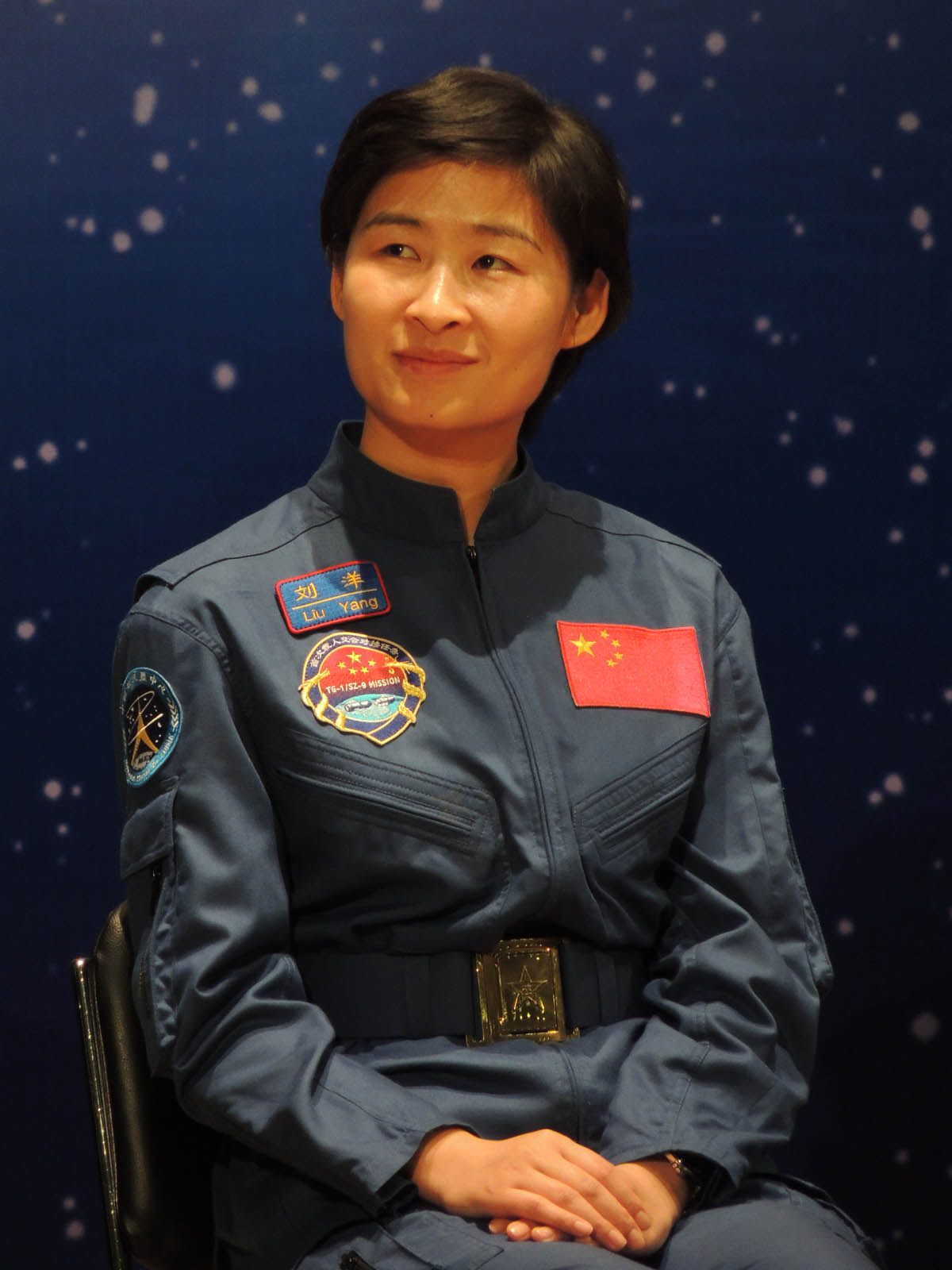
Liu Yang, the first Chinese woman in space

China has sent three women to space.

In 2012, the Chinese space program sent their first woman Liu Yang to space aboard Shenzhou 9 to dock with Tiangong-1.

China's first female astronaut candidates, chosen in 2010 from the ranks of fighter pilots, were required to be married mothers. The Chinese stated that married women were "more physically and psychologically mature" and that the rule that they had to have had children was because of concerns that spaceflight would harm their reproductive organs (including unreleased ova). The unknown nature of the effects of spaceflight on women was also noted. However, the director of the China Astronaut Centre has stated that marriage is a preference but not a strict limitation. Part of why they were so strict was because it was their first astronaut selection and they were trying be "extra cautious". China's first woman astronaut, Liu Yang, was married but had no children at the time of her flight in June 2012. Her second mission launched in June 2022 on Shenzhou 14.

Wang Yaping became the second Chinese female astronaut as a member of the Shenzhou 10 spaceship crew, which orbited the Earth in June 2013, and of the Tiangong-1 orbiting space station with which it docked. In October 2021, Wang again flew on Shenzhou 13, this time to the Tiangong Space Station, where she became the first Chinese female astronaut to perform a spacewalk.

Wang Haoze, who served on the Shenzhou 19 mission aboard the Tiangong Space Station, was the third Chinese woman to travel to space and the first female aerospace engineer in the Chinese Space Program. Being ethnically Manchu, she was also China's first female astronaut from an ethnic minority and second overall.

=== Other countries ===
Yi So-yeon from South Korea was launched into space as a space flight participant with Roscosmos, alongside two Russian cosmonauts.

Rayyanah Barnawi became the first female astronaut from Saudi Arabia in May 2023 on the Axiom-2 mission to the International Space Station.

Maryna Vasileuskaya was launched to the International Space Station with the Soyuz MS-25 mission in March 2024, making her the first woman and astronaut in general from the Republic of Belarus. However, she is not the first Belarusian to travel to space, with two previous ones, both male, being from the Byelorussian SSR and hence travelling as citizens of the Soviet Union.

== Privately funded ==
In May 1991 Helen Sharman went into space on a flight to the Mir space station as a spaceflight participant. Her flight was privately funded by Project Juno, a British-Soviet collaboration. She was the second person and first woman to be funded privately to go to space. Sharman was the first citizen of the United Kingdom to go into space, making the United Kingdom the first of two countries (the other being South Korea) to have a woman as its first person in space.

Anousheh Ansari was the fourth overall, second woman who went privately funded and first self-funded to space. As well as the first privately funded woman to fly to the International Space Station she was also the first Iranian woman citizen (dual citizenship with the US) to go to space. She flew to the station in 2006 on the Soyuz TMA-9 spacecraft. Her mission launched from the Baikonur Cosmodrome on September 18, 2006. Soyuz TMA-9 transported two-thirds of ISS Expedition 14 to the space station along with Ansari. Ansari performed several experiments on behalf of the European Space Agency.

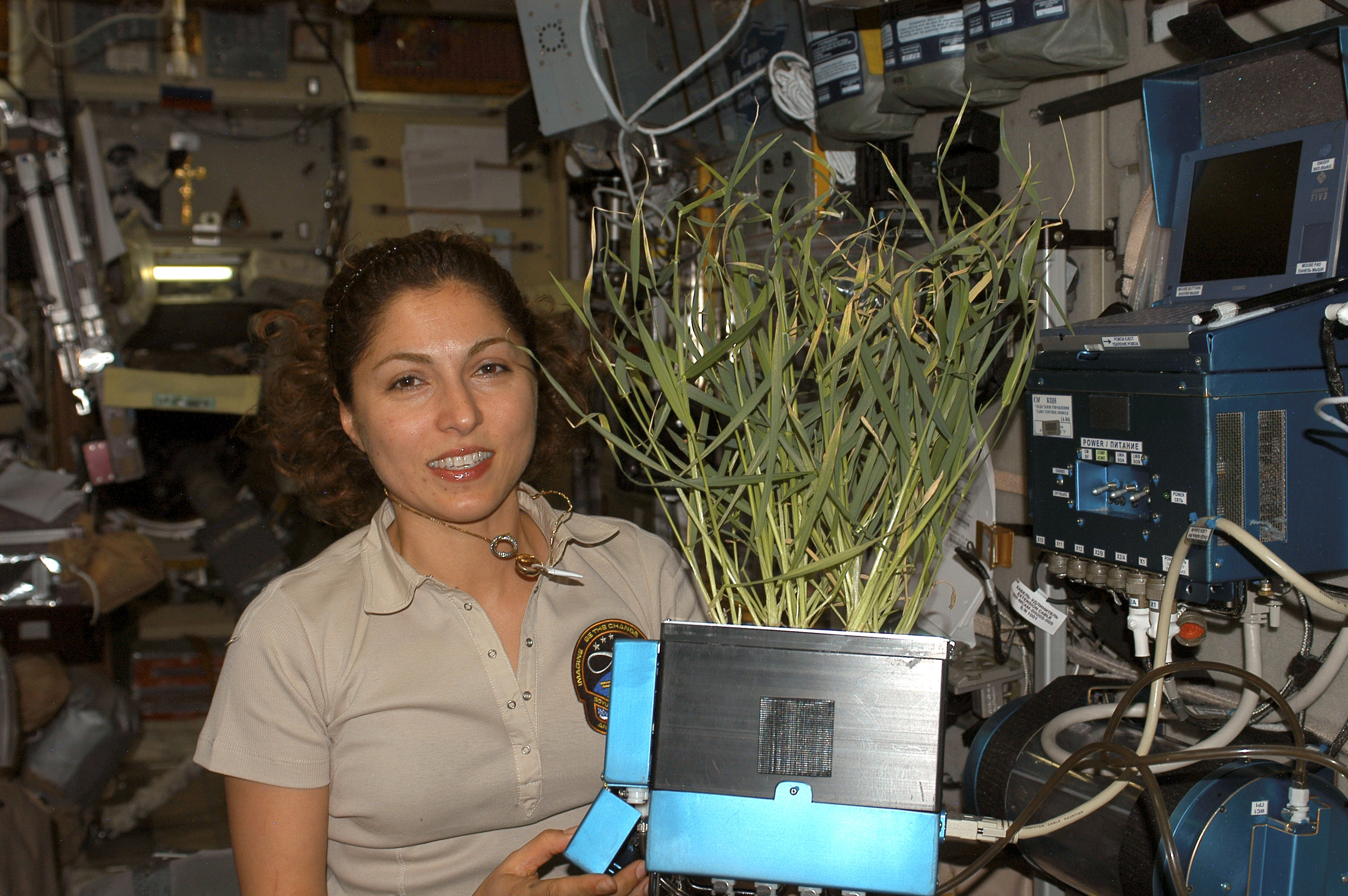
Ansari holds a plant grown in the Zvezda Service Module of the International Space Station.

In February 2019 Beth Moses of Virgin Galactic became the first commercial astronaut woman to go to space (sub-orbital). Sirisha Bandla also flew on Virgin Galactic in July 2021.

Wally Funk, member of the Mercury 13, became the oldest woman in space when she flew on Blue Origin's New Shephard sub-orbital flight on 20 July 2021. In addition to being the only member of the Mercury 13 to ever fly in space, she also broke the record for oldest person in space at the age of 82, though her record was broken by William Shatner, age 90, in October that same year.

On 16 September 2021, Sian Proctor and Hayley Arceneaux became the first female commercial astronauts to go into orbit on board Inspiration4. Shortly after, in October 2021, Russian Yulia Peresild reached space on a Soyuz flight, as the first actress, to shoot the first professional movie scenes in space as well as a space station.

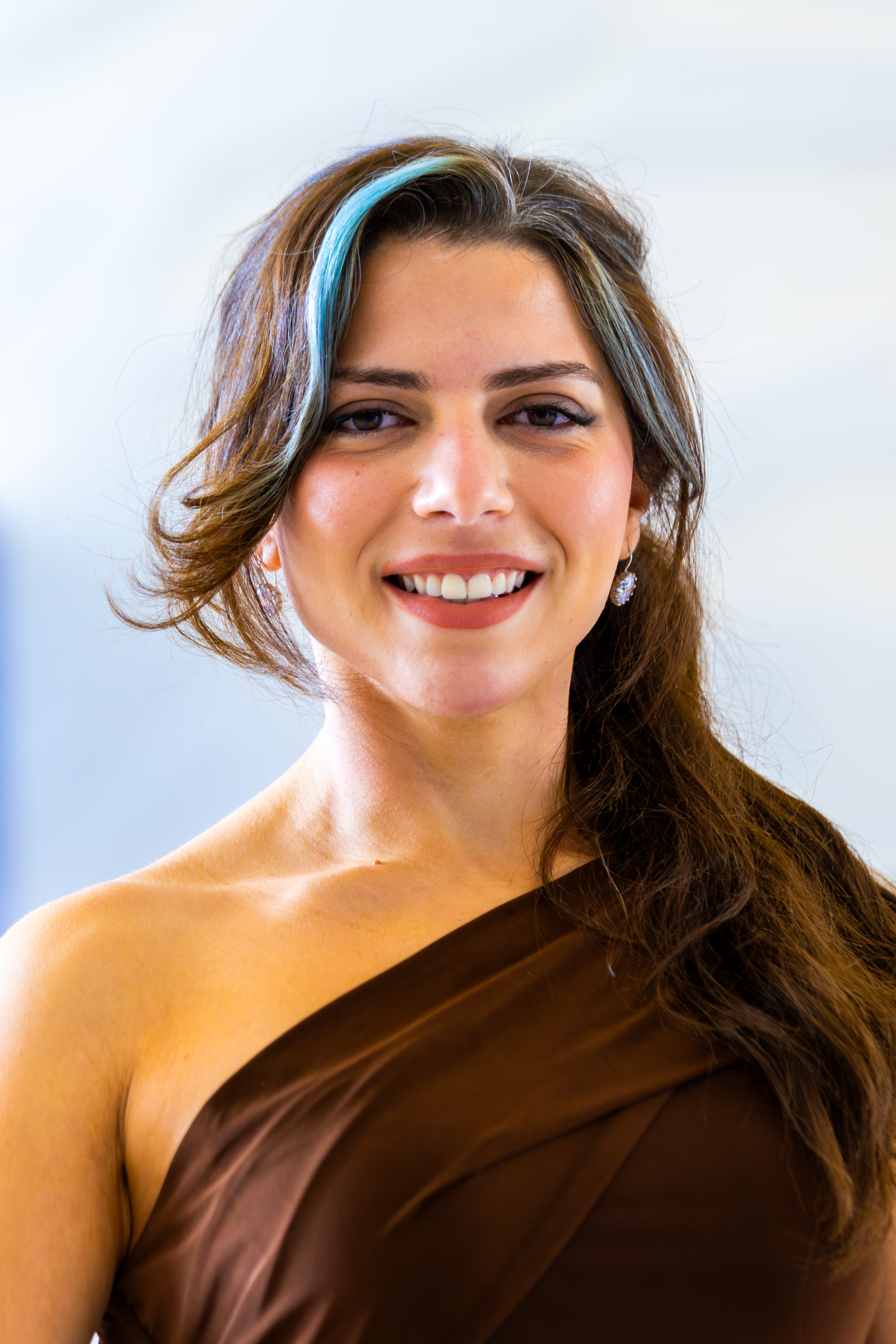
Sara Sabry the first Egyptian astronaut, one of only seven women "first flyers" for a particular country (2022)

Vanessa O'Brien carried the UN Women's flag on her sub-orbital spaceflight, Blue Origin NS-22 in August 2022. Sara Sabry from Egypt was on the same flight, becoming the first Egyptian, first Arab woman, and first woman from Africa in space.

In 2023, Kellie Gerardi served as a payload specialist on the Galactic 05 / IIAS-01 research mission with Virgin Galactic, during which she operated three biomedical and thermodynamic fluids experiments in space.

In April 2025, Rabea Rogge from Germany is first female German astronaut with human spaceflight Fram2.

In April 2025, Jannicke Mikkelsen from Norway is first female Norwegian astronaut with human spaceflight Fram2.

In April 2025, Katy Perry, Kerianne Flynn, Gayle King, Lauren Sánchez, Amanda Nguyen, and Aisha Bowe were part of the first all female space crew since 1963 on Blue Origin's New Shepard. The flight lasted 11 minutes and took the crew to the Karman line, the internationally recognised boundary of space, before returning to Earth.

== Non-astronaut personnel ==
Alongside astronauts, there have been many women who have been working in astronautics and related fields. To name some:

- Eilene Galloway
- Laurel van der Wal
- Katherine Johnson
- Mary Jackson
- Dorothy Vaughan
- Nichelle Nichols

A number of other high-profile women have contributed to interest in space programs. In the early 2000s, Lori Garver initiated a project to increase the visibility and viability of commercial spaceflight with the "AstroMom" project. She aimed to fill an unused Soyuz seat bound for the International Space Station because "…creating a spacefaring civilization was one of the most important things we could do in our lifetime."

== See also ==
- List of female astronauts
- List of spaceflight records
- List of space travelers by nationality
- Maximum Absorbency Garment (unisex garment to help contain bodily emissions during spaceflight, specifically designed for women)
- Mercury 13
- List of female explorers and travelers
- Human presence in space
- Women in Antarctica
