= Zhanna Yorkina =

Unflown Soviet cosmonaut (1939–2015)

- Жанна Ёркина
- Born: 6 May 1939; Soltsy, Novgorod Oblast, USSR
- Died: 25 May 2015 (aged 76); Zvyozdny gorodok, Moscow Oblast, Russian Federation

Zhanna Dmitriyevna Yorkina (Russian: Жанна Дмитриевна Ёркина; 6 May 1939 – 25 May 2015) was a Soviet citizen who received cosmonaut training, but never flew in space.

== Early years ==
Zhanna Yorkinna was born in Soltsy in the Novgorod Oblast in the Soviet Union. She graduated from the Pedagogic Institute in the city of Ryazan with a degree in English. She was also able to speak both German and French which greatly aided her in her selection as a cosmonaut.

== Selection ==
In December 1961, the selection of female cosmonaut trainees was authorized by the Soviet government, with the specific intention of ensuring the first woman in space was a Soviet citizen. In February 1962, Yorkina was selected as a member of a group of five female cosmonauts to be trained for a solo spaceflight in a Vostok spacecraft. She was selected to be a cosmonaut on 4 March 1962. She was approved by the Soviet Medical Commission on 3 April 1962. Her hobby of parachuting led her to be a cosmonaut candidate. She was a club parachutist at Ryazan while also working as a high school language teacher. At the age of 22, she was asked by the Soviet government if she would be willing to take a test, though they misled her explaining if she passed the test she would get to jump from a ship. Later, she discovered that she would actually be jumping from a spaceship. Like several others in the group, she was an amateur parachutist. Being a qualified parachutist was almost a qualifying skill during the screening process. While at the time it was considered to be a classified reason, it was later revealed that due to the early models of Soviet spacecraft, it required the cosmonauts to be ejected from their capsules and deploy a parachute to land separately from the spacecraft. In order to meet the qualifications and rigors for the space program, the female candidates also needed to be less than 30 years old, under 170 cm (5 ft 7 in) and less than 70 kg (154 lb).

== Training ==
Yorkina, along with the other four women chosen for the space program, had to endure some of the most intense training in only six months because the USSR wanted to launch the first woman into space. The training included classes in astronomy and aeronautics and training in swimming and gymnastics. They had to undergo centrifuge training which Yorkina recalled being very difficult. She stated, "This does not feel nice. If you relax your abdomen, you will get unconscious, which often happened to the men as well. We had a remote control in our hands while testing. If you hold it, it means you were conscious. If not, you have passed out, and they take you out." They also had to go through heat chamber acclimation where they were exposed to temperatures as high as 40 °C (104 °F) with 30 percent humidity.

In 1963, she married Valery Sergeychik, with whom she had two children, Valery and Svetlana, in violation of Sergey Korolyov's rule that female cosmonauts must put off having children and dedicate themselves to the space program.

Valentina Tereshkova was chosen to be the first woman in space. She launched into Earth orbit in June 1963 aboard Vostok 6. Tereshkova's backup was Irina Solovyova, with Valentina Ponomaryova in a supporting "second backup" role. Yorkina suffered another setback when she suffered an ankle injury while parachuting. This caused her to miss training which set her back against her peers. Yorkina had been taken out of the running for the mission as she had performed poorly in the simulator. In April 1963, all four female cosmonauts spent three days in the Vostok Simulator. While all passed, Yorkina was the least equipped to handle space flight. She only ate a third of her rations and also removed her boots on the first day of the simulation. These factors led to her fainting shortly after the test. She was very weak compared to the other female cosmonauts.

== Career ==
After the flight of Vostok 6, Yorkina worked on the Voskhod 2 mission in 1965 which included the first spacewalk. She was appointed afterwards as backup commander for the Voskhod 4 mission. This was a 20-day single man mission which studied long term weightlessness with various experiments. The mission was cancelled in 1966 leaving Yorkina to train for the Soyuz spacecraft until the eventual disbanding of the female cosmonaut team.

Yorkina was considered one of the least capable of the five female cosmonauts, and Nikolai Kamanin specifically complained that she was "too fond of chocolate and cakes". She was included in plans for Vostok 5, an all-female duration and spacewalk (EVA) mission, but only as the secondary member of the backup crew. Another issue that arose for Voskhod 5 was that Zvezda, the company that developed the spacesuits, declined to fabricate a special EVA suit for the women. This caused further delays and the eventual cancellation of any more Voskhod missions after Vostok 6.

Following the death of Sergei Korolev, the space program was halted and all cosmonauts were moved to the development of the Soyuz. Originally, the Vostok 5 and 6 flights were meant to be dual flights in which two ships would be launched one day apart to both be in space for around three days. Yorkina and Ponomaryova were later chosen to be part of the Vostok 6A flight. Two groups of two were chosen for the dual flights, Tereshkova and Solovyova (backup), and Ponomaryova and Yorkina (backup). This dual flight approach was created by Sergei Korolev and was on its path to completion until 21 March 1963 when Ministry of Defense Chief Ustinov, Kozlov, and Vershinin rejected the proposal. Eventually, the Vostok program settled on a single flight approach which Tereshkova had in space. Eventually, other female cosmonauts never flew.

Following cancellation of the Voskhod Program, Yorkina worked at the Yuri Gagarin Cosmonaut Training Center, and was one of the cosmonauts involved in development of the Spiral spaceplane. She retired from the space program on 1 October 1969, and from active military duty in 1989. She achieved the rank of Lieutenant Colonel in the Air Force Reserve.
