= Irina Solovyova =

Soviet cosmonaut (born 1937)

- Ирина Соловьёва
- Born: 6 September 1937 (age 88); Kireyevsk, Tula
- Known for: Cosmonaut
- Notable work: Soviet Air Force, Civilian Parachutist, One of Five women to be selected for spaceflight program.

Irina Solovyova (born September 6, 1937) is a retired Soviet cosmonaut active from 1962 to 1969. Solovyova was born in Kireyevsk, Tula in Russia and is known for being one of the five women chosen to join the Soviet Union's all-female space squad.

Irina Solovyova emerged as a public figure in the midst of the Cold War. The idea to launch the first female flight was conceived by Nikolai Kamanin in 1961. Kamanin convinced Sergey Korolev, former Soviet rocket engineer to consider his idea, and half a year later an agreement was reached to recruit five female cosmonauts. Over 800 women applied for the position, however only fifty-eight were considered. Following the application process, twenty-three women were chosen for the advanced medical screening in Moscow, with Solovyova being one of them. Twenty-four year old Solovyova was approached by the Soviet leaders and offered the position on the space squad.

Upon accepting the offer to join the space squad, Solovyova began her training in Star City of the Soviet Union, the home to the Yuri Gagarin Cosmonaut Training Center since the 1960s. The five women chosen to train in Star City on the space squad included Solovyova, Zhanna Yorkina, Tatyana Kuzenetsova, Valentina Ponomareva, and Valentina Tereshkova. Valentina Tereshkova was eventually chosen to fly, and Solovyova became her alternate. Solovyova's replacement and fellow trainee in Star City, Valentina Tereshkova, spent three days in space aboard Vostok 6, and then successfully parachuted to earth. Solovyova's colleague, Tereshkova, went on the receive the Order of Lenin and Hero of the Soviet Union awards, the highest award in the Soviet Union. Although she was mainly needed as back up for Valentina Tereshkova, Solovyova held a great contribution to the beginning of female exploration of space.

Solovyova, originally from Ural, was an engineer with a science degree before she was chosen to join the space squad. She attended and graduated from the Sverdlovsk Polytechnic Institute. Solovyova was also a member of the national skydiving team along with her fiancé at the time, Sergey Kiselev, who was a skydiving instructor.

Solovyova was also selected to have the opportunity to be the first woman to walk in space, however Svetlana Savitskaya ended up being chosen. Before she was chosen to be a cosmonaut, Solovyova was a world champion member of Soviet's national parachutists.

She was awarded the Belarusian Order For Service to the Motherland in the Armed Forces, 3rd class.

Solovyova is married to Sergei A. Kiselyov, and has two children named Aleksei and Yelena.

== Education ==
1959 – Graduated from Sverdlovsk Polytechnic Institute with a degree in mechanical engineering

1967 – Graduated from Zhukovsky Air Force Engineering Academy, Monino

1980 – Candidate of psychological sciences degree

== Training ==
Irina Solovyova was a trained civilian cosmonaut. She is a retired Colonel in the Soviet Air Force. She completed cosmonaut training from April 1962 through the 29th of November in 1962 alongside Kuznetsova and Tereshkova. She also became a member of an all-female Antarctic Expedition in February 1988.

== Female cosmonaut interview ==
In January 1962, DOSAAF (a Russian Volunteer Society for Cooperation with the Army, Aviation, and Navy) sends a file of 58 female cosmonaut candidates, pilots and parachutists. Of which 40 are to be interviewed to undergo a training at TsPK (cosmonaut training center or Tsentr Podgotovki Kosmonavtov) which will prepare the team for the Flight: Vostok 6. Before Solovyova was contacted, she was a 24 year old engineer in Ural with a science degree who was a part of the skydiving team.

Nikolai Petrovich Kamanin reviews the plans with only 17 cosmonauts for the TsPK.

When Kamanin & his staff finally interviewed, there were 23 of the 58 female cosmonaut candidates. He was looking for young, physically fit women who had undergone flight and parachute training for at least five to six months.

With the pool of Soviet female pilots being limited, potential candidates were also sought who were active sport parachutists.

== Female cosmonaut training group ==
A group was selected for the crewed space program – Vostok 6 based on the following qualifications:

- under 30 years of age
- under 170 cm (5 ft 7 in) tall
- under 70 kg (150 lb) in weight

The five Soviet women selected were: Kuznetsova, Ponomaryova, Solovyova, Tereshkova, Yorkina on 16 February 1962 and reported for training a month later. However, the flight of a woman in space had little support from Chief Designer Korolev or Kamanin's military commanders.

=== Training ===
The five female cosmonaut group underwent the complete course of cosmonaut training including weightless flights, parachute jumps, isolation tests, centrifuge tests, and academic studies of rocket theory and spacecraft engineering. The women undertook 120 parachute jumps and received pilot training in MiG-15UTI jet trainers.

In May 1962 a Soviet delegation, including cosmonaut Gherman Titov and Kamanin, visited Washington. Meeting astronaut John Glenn, they learned of the Mercury 13, a privately funded program where 13 American women were selected by NASA for project Mercury. The female pilots had passed the astronaut physical and were lobbying to be trained as Mercury astronauts. Kamanin learned from Glenn that the first American woman would make a three-orbit Mercury flight by the end of 1962. Seeing the competition, Kamanin decided to move ahead with the first flight of a Soviet women within weeks of his return.

At the initial stages of the training, Kamanin places Solovyova in the first ranks as most likely to be first in space.

== Future Expedition Involvement ==
Solovyova was involved in the plans for another expedition in 1965, when Kamanin proposed new missions for the Voskhod system in April of that year. Ponomaryova and Solovyova were proposed for an all-female spacewalk mission, with Ponomaryova as pilot and Solovyova the spacewalker. The female cosmonauts were informed of the proposed mission, but Kamanin warned them that there might be strong opposition. He was correct. The U.S. Gemini program had just announced a mission that would last 7 to 8 days. In an attempt to maintain their supposed lead in crewed spaceflight, the Soviets planners altered their timetable and the Ponomaryova-Solovyova mission never happened.
