= Valentina Ponomaryova =

Soviet cosmonaut, pilot and scientist (1933–2023)

- Валентина Пономарёва
- Born: Valentina Leonidovna Kovalevskaya; 18 September 1933; Moscow, Russian SFSR, Soviet Union
- Died: 8 November 2023 (aged 90); Moscow, Russia
- Space career
- Rank: Polkovnik

Valentina Leonidovna Ponomaryova (Russian: Валентина Леонидовна Пономарёва; née Kovalevskaya [Ковалевская]; 18 September 1933 – 8 November 2023), was a Soviet Russian cosmonaut, pilot and scientist.

== Biography ==
Ponomaryova left the school for girls No. 156 in Moscow with a gold medal in 1951. She graduated from the Moscow Aviation Institute in 1957 and the Zhukovsky-Academy, Monino in 1967.

In December 1961, the selection of female cosmonauts was authorized by the Soviet Government, with the specific intention of ensuring the first woman in space was a Soviet citizen. In February 1962, Ponomaryova was selected in a group of five female cosmonauts to be trained for a Vostok flight. The group spent several months in intensive training, concluding with examinations in November 1962, after which the four remaining candidates were commissioned Junior Lieutenants in the Soviet Air Force. Ponomaryova established herself as one of the leading candidates with Valentina Tereshkova and Irina Solovyova, and a joint mission profile was developed that would see two women launched into space, on solo Vostok flights on consecutive days. The honour of being the first woman in space was to be given to Valentina Tereshkova, who would launch first on Vostok 5, while Ponomaryova would follow her into orbit on Vostok 6. However, Ponomaryova did not respond with standard Soviet cliches in interviews and her feminism made the Soviet leadership uneasy, and this led to the flight profile being altered in March 1963. Vostok 5 would now carry a male, cosmonaut Valery Bykovsky, flying the joint mission with Tereshkova aboard Vostok 6 in June 1963. Tereshkova's backup was Irina Solovyova, with Ponomaryova in a supporting 'second back-up' role.

Despite this setback, Ponomaryova remained with the program until 1969. She was at one stage slated to fly on a circumlunar Soyuz flight in 1965 before substantial delays in the Soyuz spacecraft led to the cancellation of this flight. She was also to lead an all-female crew on a ten-day mission aboard Voskhod 5 but the program was cancelled before she had a chance to fly. Ponomaryova retired in 1969 when it became clear that there were no plans for a female Soyuz flight.

Ponomaryova later worked in orbital mechanics at the Gagarin Training Center. Following this, she was a research scientist at the Institute of Natural Historic Sciences. She was awarded a Candidate of Technical Sciences degree in 1974.

In 1972, she married fellow cosmonaut Yury Ponomaryov, and the couple had two children before divorcing. As with Valentina, Yuri did not get to fly into space, although he did serve on the Soyuz 18 backup crew.

Valentina Ponomaryova died on 8 November 2023, at the age of 90.
