= Vostok 6 =

1963 Soviet crewed spaceflight

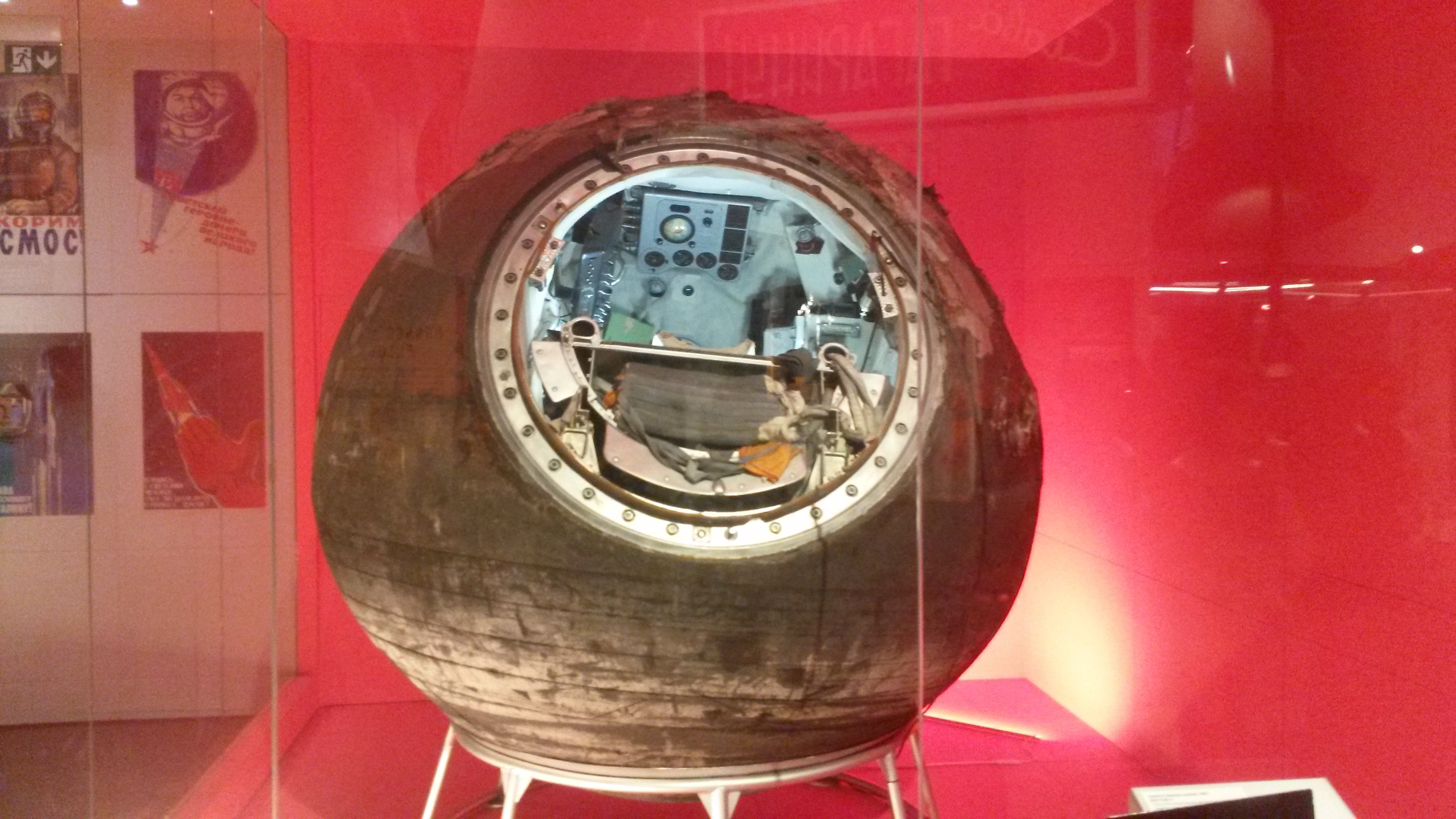
- The Vostok 6 capsule in a museum display (2016)
- Operator: Soviet space program
- COSPAR ID: 1963-023A
- SATCAT no.: 595
- Mission duration: 2 days, 22 hours, 50 minutes
- Orbits completed: 48

Spacecraft properties
- Spacecraft: Vostok-3KA No.8
- Manufacturer: Experimental Design Bureau OKB-1
- Launch mass: 4,713 kilograms (10,390 lb)

Crew
- Crew size: 1
- Members: Valentina Tereshkova
- Callsign: Чайка (Chayka - "Seagull")

Start of mission
- Launch date: 16 June 1963, 09:29:52 UTC
- Rocket: Vostok-K 8K72K
- Launch site: Baikonur 1/5

End of mission
- Landing date: 19 June 1963, 08:20 UTC
- Landing site: 53.209375°N 80.80395°E

Orbital parameters
- Reference system: Geocentric
- Regime: Low Earth
- Eccentricity: 0.00365
- Perigee altitude: 164 kilometres (102 mi)
- Apogee altitude: 212 kilometres (132 mi)
- Inclination: 65.09 degrees
- Period: 88.25 minutes
- Epoch: 16 June 1963, 05:36:00 UTC
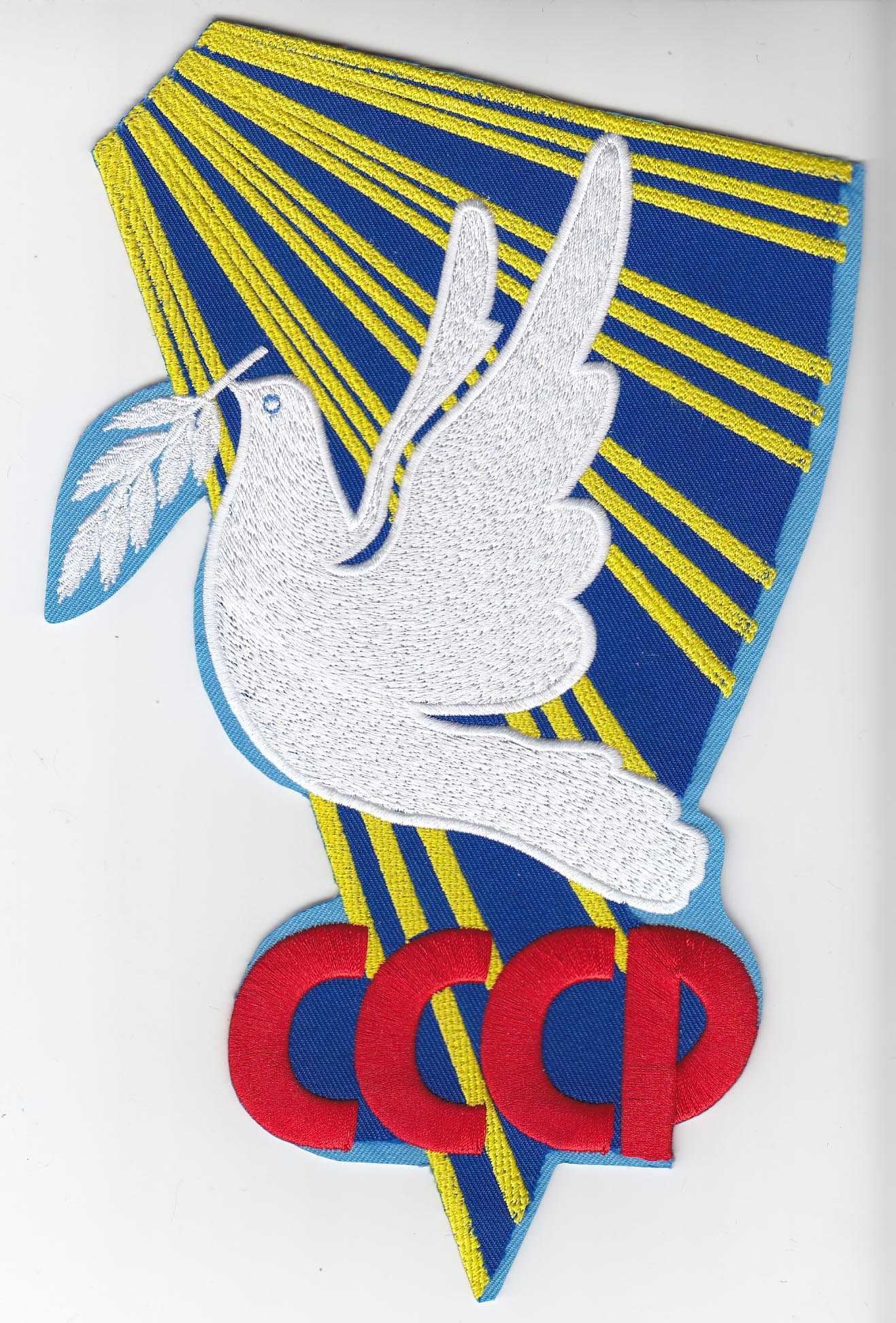
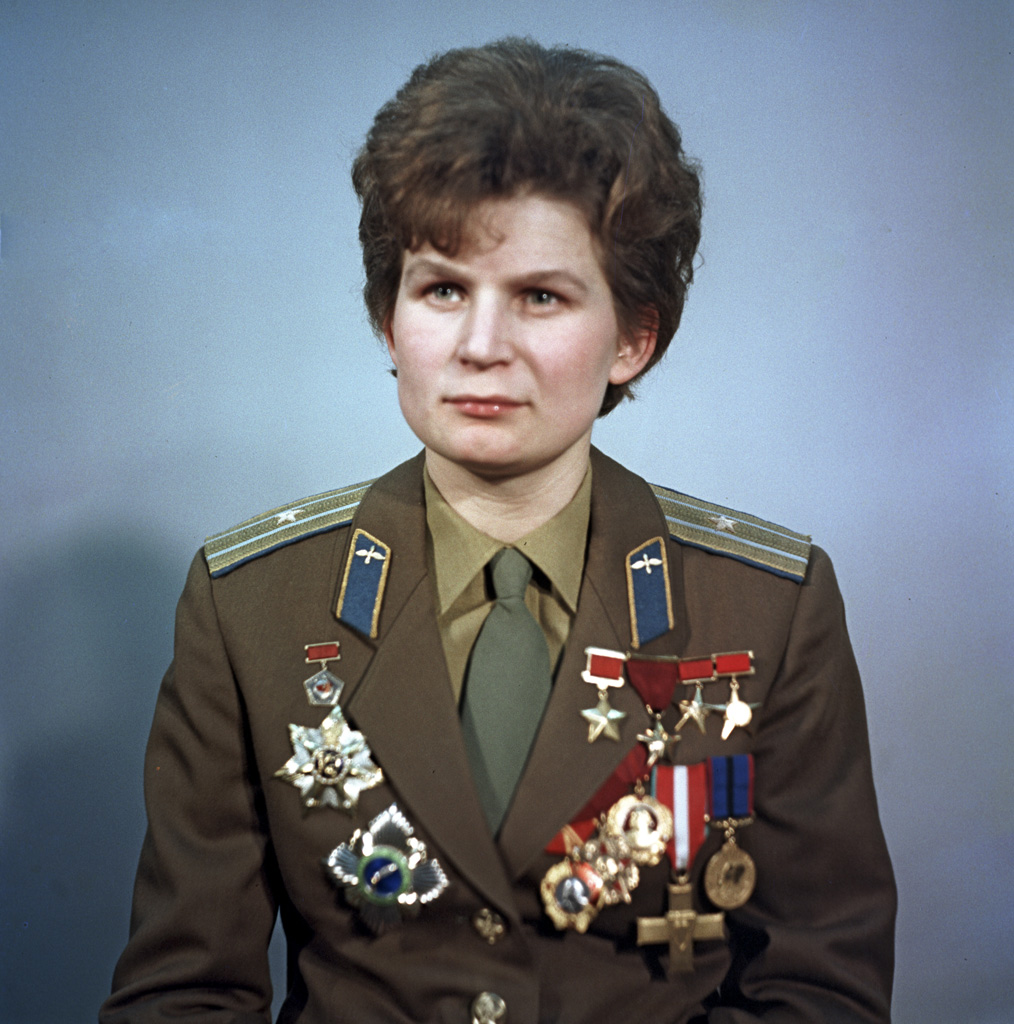
- Valentina Tereshkova, first female cosmonaut, Hero of the Soviet Union awarded in 1963, pictured in 1969 Vostok program

Vostok 6 (Russian: Восток-6, lit. 'Orient 6' or 'East 6') was the first human spaceflight to carry a woman, cosmonaut Valentina Tereshkova, into space.

== Mission ==
The spacecraft was launched on 16 June 1963. It set the record for highest orbital inclination of a crewed spacecraft at 65°, a record not broken until the 90° polar orbit of Fram2 nearly 62 years later. While Vostok 5 had been delayed by technical problems, Vostok 6's launch proceeded with no difficulties. Data collected during the mission provided better understanding of the female body's reaction to spaceflight. Like other cosmonauts on Vostok missions, Tereshkova maintained a flight log, took photographs, and manually oriented the spacecraft. Her photographs of the horizon from space were later used to identify aerosol layers within the atmosphere. The mission, a joint flight with Vostok 5, was originally conceived as being a joint mission with two Vostoks each carrying a female cosmonaut, but this changed as the Vostok program experienced cutbacks as a precursor to the retooling of the program into the Voskhod program. Vostok 6 was the last flight of a Vostok 3KA spacecraft and the final flight of the Vostok programme.

The Vostok 6 landing site coordinates are 53.209375°N 80.80395°E, 200 km (120 mi) west of Barnaul, Altai, Russia and 7 km (4.3 mi) south of Baevo, and 650 km (400 mi) northeast of Karagandy, Kazakhstan. At the site, in a small park at the roadside is a statue of Tereshkova, with arms outstretched, at the top of a curved column.

The capsule is now on display at the RKK Energia Museum in Korolyov (near Moscow). From September 2015 it formed part of the content of the "Cosmonauts" exhibition at the Science Museum, London. The Exhibition featured many iconic objects from the Soviet space program.

=== During flight ===
The Soviet state television network broadcast live video of Tereshkova from a camera inside the capsule, and she conversed with Premier Nikita Khrushchev over the radio. Communications with ground controllers about her overall health were described in post-flight reports as "evasive", and later official accounts of the mission had somewhat condescending remarks about Tereshkova's overall in-flight performance.

Radio Moscow announces the historic flight of Tereskhova

In Tereshkova's account of the mission in her postflight debriefing, she mentioned having assorted body pains and difficulty with her helmet headset (also reported by Byskovsky on Vostok- 5). She vomited while attempting to eat, although she attributed this to the taste of the food rather than her physical condition. Another problem was that while the Soviet space agency had provided her with food, water and tooth paste, they had forgotten to pack a toothbrush.

An official history of the Soviet space program published in 1973 described Tereshkova's physical condition and in-flight performance as udovletvoritel'noe (удовлетворительное, 'fair' or 'adequate') rather than otlichno (отлично, 'good' or 'outstanding').

=== During landing ===
Like all the previous Vostok flights, Tereshkova had to eject from the capsule. She landed safely by parachute. But almost fell into a lake.

It was revealed in 2004 that an error in the control program made the spaceship ascend from orbit instead of descending. Tereskhova noticed the fault on the first day of the flight and reported it to spacecraft designer Sergey Korolev. Flight controllers then provided Tereskhova with data to enter into the descent program. By request of Korolev, Tereshkova kept the problem secret. "I kept silent, but Evgeny Vasilievich decided to make it public. So, I can easily talk about it now."

== Pilot ==
Position	Crew
Pilot	Valentina Tereshkova; Only spaceflight

=== Backup ===
Position	Crew
Pilot	Irina Solovyova

=== Reserve ===
Position	Crew
PIlot	Valentina Ponomaryova

== Mission parameters ==
- Mass: 4,713 kg (10,390 lb)
- Apogee: 231 km (144 mi)
- Perigee: 180 km (110 mi)
- Inclination: 64.9°
- Period: 88.3 minutes
