= Tatyana Kuznetsova =

Soviet cosmonaut (1941–2018)

Tatyana Kuznetsova in the 1970s

Tatyana Dmitryevna Kuznetsova (Russian: Татьяна Дмитриевна Кузнецова; 14 July 1941 – 28 August 2018) was a Soviet cosmonaut. She was the youngest person ever selected by a government human spaceflight program.

== Life ==
Kuznetsova was born in Moscow in 1941. In 1958, she completed her secondary schooling, and the following year, enrolled to study typing and shorthand. Her first job, in 1959, was as a stenographer at the Ministry of Radioelectronic Industry in Moscow, followed by secretarial positions at other government research institutes.

In 1958, as a teenager, she took up parachuting as a hobby, and by 1961, she was a regional and national champion. In 1964, she became a parachuting instructor.

In December 1961, the selection of female cosmonaut trainees was authorised by the Soviet government, with the specific intention of ensuring the first woman in space was a Soviet citizen. In February 1962, Kuznetsova was selected from over 400 applicants to join a group of five female cosmonauts to be trained for a solo spaceflight in a Vostok spacecraft. Even though she was only 20 years old, her skill and courage in parachuting led the cosmonaut recruiters to select her for their programme. In the early days of her training, Kuznetsova was the favourite to become the first woman in space, but by late summer 1962, some failures in the physically and emotionally tough preparation regime resulted in her being removed from training.

Despite her earlier difficulties, Kuznetsova was recalled to cosmonaut training in January 1965 to prepare for a spaceflight on a two-woman Voskhod 5 mission, but the project was cancelled before she had a chance to fly.

Kuznetsova finally retired from the cosmonaut program in 1969 when it became clear that no women would be included on future Soviet flights. However, she stayed at the training centre and assisted with geophysical experiments and studies. From 1979, she served in the Air Force Reserves and rose to the rank of lieutenant-colonel before retiring in 1991.

Kuznetsova died on 28 August 2018.
