= List of fully civilian crewed orbital spaceflights =

Following the definition that a civilian is someone who is not part of their country's armed forces, there have been a total of 27 fully civilian crewed orbital space missions (2026), listed below:

== List ==
No.	Mission / Emblem	Spacecraft	Date of launch	Date of landing	Crew	Station	Outcome
1	Soyuz TMA-3	Soyuz TMA; 11F732A17 #213	18 October 2003	30 April 2004	(Russia) Alexander Kaleri (United Kingdom) / (United States) Michael Foale (Spain) Pedro Duque	International Space Station	Success
2	Soyuz TMA-03M	Soyuz TMA-M; 11F732A47 #703	21 December 2011	1 July 2012	(Russia) Oleg Kononenko (Netherlands) André Kuipers (United States) Donald Pettit	International Space Station	Success
3	Soyuz TMA-07M	Soyuz TMA-M; 11F732A47 #704A	19 December 2012	14 May 2013	(Russia) Roman Romanenko (Canada) Chris Hadfield (United States) Thomas Marshburn	International Space Station	Success
4	Soyuz TMA-11M	Soyuz TMA-M; 11F732A47 #711	7 November 2013	14 May 2014	(Russia) Mikhail Tyurin (United States) Richard Mastracchio (Japan) Koichi Wakata	International Space Station	Success
5	Soyuz TMA-17M	Soyuz TMA-M; 11F732A47 #717	23 July 2015	11 December 2015	(Russia) Oleg Kononenko (Japan) Kimiya Yui (United States) Kjell Lindgren	International Space Station	Success
6	Soyuz TMA-20M	Soyuz TMA-M; 11F732A47 #720	19 March 2016	6 September 2016	(Russia) Aleksey Ovchinin (Russia) Oleg Skripochka (United States) Jeffrey Williams	International Space Station	Success
7	Soyuz MS-01	Soyuz MS; 11F732A48 #731	7 July 2016	30 October 2016	(Russia) Anatoli Ivanishin (Japan) Takuya Onishi (United States) Kathleen Rubins	International Space Station	Success
8	Soyuz MS-03	Soyuz MS; 11F732A48 #733	17 November 2016	2 June 2017	(Russia) Oleg Novitskiy (France) Thomas Pesquet (United States) Peggy A. Whitson	International Space Station	Success
9	Soyuz MS-05	Soyuz MS; 11F732A48 #736	28 July 2017	14 December 2017	(Russia) Sergey Ryazansky (Italy) Paolo Nespoli (United States) Randolph Bresnik	International Space Station	Success
10	Soyuz MS-06	Soyuz MS; 11F732A48 #734	12 September 2017	28 February 2018	(Russia) Alexander Misurkin (United States) Joseph Acaba (United States) Mark Vande Hei	International Space Station	Success
11	Soyuz MS-08	Soyuz MS; 11F732A48 #738	21 March 2018	4 October 2018	(Russia) Oleg Artemyev (United States) Richard Arnold (United States) Andrew Feustel	International Space Station	Success
12	Soyuz MS-09	Soyuz MS; 11F732A48 #739	6 June 2018	20 December 2018	(Russia) Sergey Prokopyev (United States) Serena Auñón-Chancellor (Germany) Alexander Gerst	International Space Station	Success
13	Soyuz MS-17	Soyuz MS; 11F732A48 #747	14 October 2020	17 April 2021	(Russia) Sergey Ryzhikov (Russia) Sergey Kud-Sverchkov (United States) Kathleen Rubins	International Space Station	Success
14	Soyuz MS-18	Soyuz MS; 11F732A48 #748	9 April 2021	17 October 2021	(Russia) Oleg Novitsky (Russia) Pyotr Dubrov (United States) Mark T. Vande Hei	International Space Station	Success
15	SpaceX Crew-2	Crew Dragon Endeavour C206.1	23 April 2021	9 November 2021	(United States) Shane Kimbrough (United States) K. Megan McArthur (Japan) Akihiko Hoshide (France) Thomas Pesquet	International Space Station	Success
16	Inspiration4	Crew Dragon Resilience C207.2	16 September 2021	18 September 2021	(United States) Jared Isaacman (United States) Sian Proctor (United States) Hayley Arceneaux (United States) Christopher Sembroski	Low Earth orbit	Success
17	Soyuz MS-19	Soyuz MS; 11F732A48 #749	5 October 2021	30 March 2022	(Russia) Anton Shkaplerov (Russia) Klim Shipenko (Russia) Yulia Peresild	International Space Station	Success
18	SpaceX Crew-3	Crew Dragon Endurance C210.1	11 November 2021	6 May 2022	(United States) Raja Chari (United States) Thomas Marshburn (Germany) Matthias Maurer (United States) Kayla Barron	International Space Station	Success
19	Soyuz MS-20	Soyuz MS 11F732A48 #752	8 December 2021	20 December 2021	(Russia) Aleksandr Misurkin (Japan) Yusaku Maezawa (Japan) Yozo Hirano	International Space Station	Success
20	Soyuz MS-21	Soyuz MS 11F732 #750	18 March 2022	29 September 2022	(Russia) Oleg Artemyev (Russia) Denis Matveev (Russia) Sergey Korsakov	International Space Station	Success
21	Axiom Mission 1	Crew Dragon Endeavour (C206.3)	8 April 2022	15 April 2022	(United States) / (Spain) Michael López-Alegría (United States) Larry Connor (Canada) Mark Pathy (Israel) Eytan Stibbe	International Space Station	Success
22	SpaceX Crew-4	Crew Dragon Freedom (C212.1)	27 April 2022	14 October 2022	(United States) Kjell N. Lindgren (United States) Robert Hines (Italy) Samantha Cristoforetti (United States) Jessica Watkins	International Space Station	Success
23	SpaceX Crew-6	Crew Dragon Endeavour (C206.4)	2 March 2023	4 September 2023	(United States) Stephen Bowen (United States) Warren Hoburg (United Arab Emirates) Sultan Al Neyadi (Russia) Andrey Fedyaev	International Space Station	Success
24	Soyuz MS-24	Soyuz MS 11F732 #755	15 September 2023	6 April 2024	(Russia) Oleg Kononenko (Russia) Nikolai Chub (United States) Loral O'Hara	International Space Station	Success
25	Soyuz MS-25	Soyuz MS 11F732 #756	23 March 2024	23 September 2024	(Russia) Oleg Novitsky (Belarus) Marina Vasilevskaya (United States) Tracy Caldwell-Dyson	International Space Station	Success
26	Boeing Crewed Flight Test	Boeing Starliner Calypso (S3.2)	5 July 2024	7 September 2024	(United States) Barry E. Wilmore (United States) Sunita Williams	International Space Station	Success
27	Polaris Dawn	Crew Dragon Resilience (C207.3)	10 September 2024	15 September 2024	(United States) Jared Isaacman (United States) Scott Poteet (United States) Sarah Gillis (United States) Anna Menon	Low Earth orbit	Success
27	Fram2	Crew Dragon Resilience (C207.4)	1 April 2025	4 April 2025	(Malta) / (Saint Kitts and Nevis) (Note: Wang was born in China but lives primarily in Svalbard and since 2023 is also a citizen of Malta and Saint Kitts and Nevis through their golden visa programs. He will wear the flag of Malta on his spacesuit during the spaceflight.) Chun Wang (Norway) / (United Kingdom) (Note: Mikkelsen was born in the United Kingdom, but is now a citizen of Norway. She will wear the flag of Norway on her spacesuit during the spaceflight.) Jannicke Mikkelsen (Germany) Rabea Rogge (Australia) Eric Philips	polar LEO (Retrograde)	Success

== See also ==
- List of Soyuz missions
- List of human spaceflights
- List of fully civilian crewed suborbital spaceflights
- Timeline of private spaceflight
