= Timeline of private spaceflight =

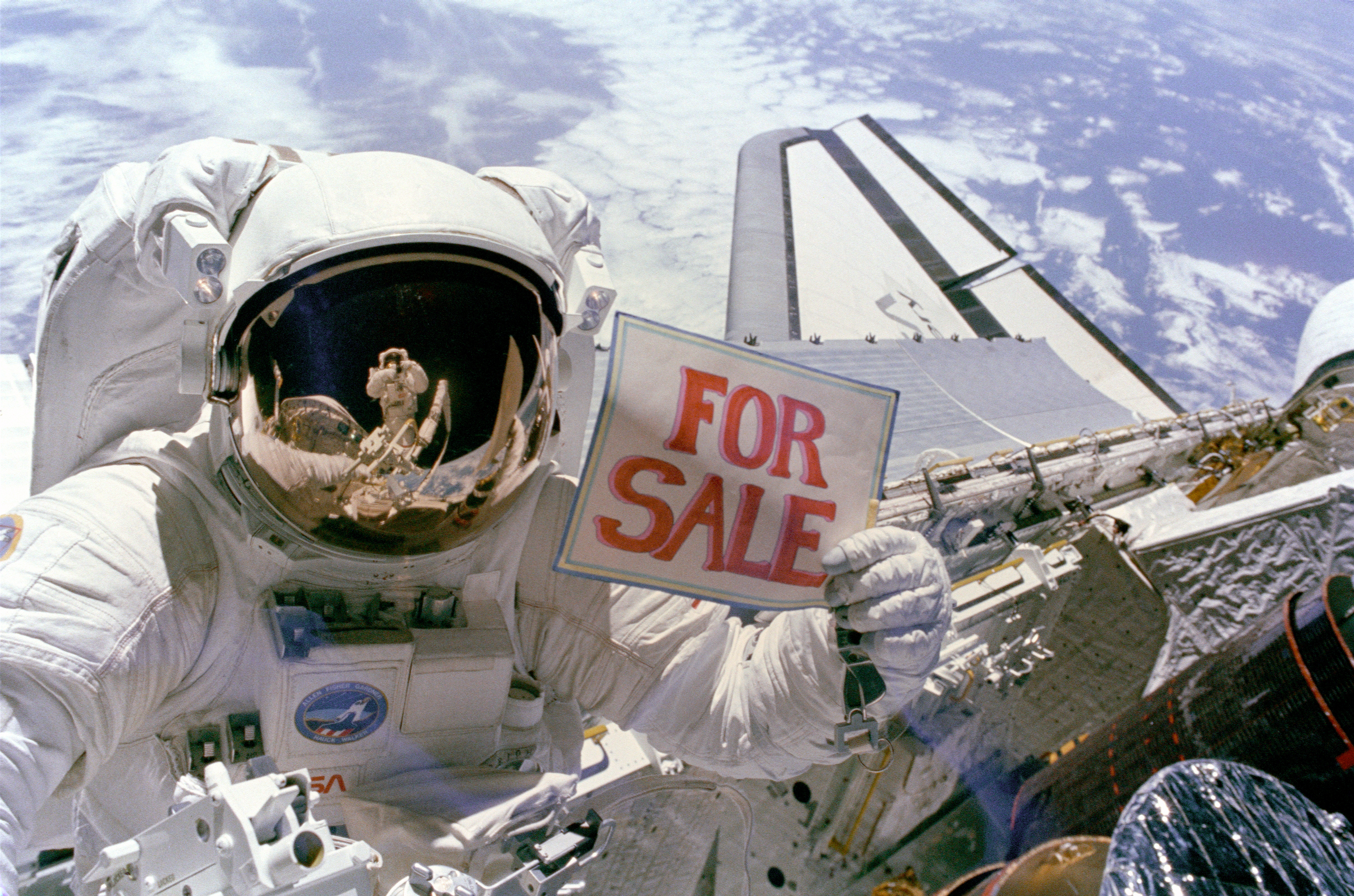
Astronaut Dale A. Gardner holding a "For Sale" sign in 1984, referring to recovered non-functional private satellites (Palapa B-2 and Westar 6, both were later successfully relaunched)

The following is a timeline of important events in the history of private spaceflight, including important technical as well as legislative and political advances. Though the industry has its origins in the early 1960s, soon after the beginning of the Space Age, private companies did not begin conducting launches into space until the 1980s, and it was not until the 21st century that multiple companies began privately developing and operating launch vehicles and spacecraft in earnest.

== Before 1980 ==
- 12 December 1961 – OSCAR 1, the first amateur built satellite, is launched aboard an American Thor-Agena rocket.

The continuous radio Morse message "hi hi hi ..." by the first private satellites called OSCAR, beginning with OSCAR 1 in 1961 (recording from OSCAR 2, 1962)

- 10 July 1962 – Telstar 1, the first satellite to be used commercially, is launched on the first commercially sponsored space launch, aboard a Thor-Delta rocket.
- 31 August 1962 – President John F. Kennedy signs the Communications Satellite Act of 1962 providing the regulatory framework for private companies in the United States to own and operate their own satellites.
- 6 April 1965 – Intelsat Intelsat 1 known as "Early Bird" was the first commercial communications satellite to be placed in geosynchronous orbit.
- 9 November 1972 – Canadian Telesat Anik A1 launched world's first domestic communications satellite in geostationary orbit operated by a commercial company.
- 13 April 1974 – Western Union Westar 1 becomes America's first domestic and commercially launched geostationary communications satellite.
- 1975 – OTRAG, the first company to attempt private development and manufacture of space propulsion systems, is founded in Stuttgart, Germany, though its program is ultimately abandoned in the early 1980s.

== 1980s ==
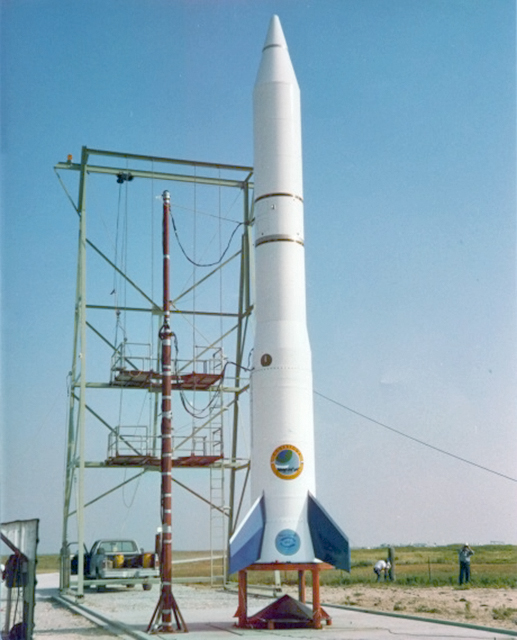
Conestoga I prepared for launch

- 9 September 1982 – Conestoga I, a repurposed Minuteman second stage, is launched from Matagorda Island to an altitude of 309 km (192 miles) by Space Services Inc., becoming the first privately owned and operated rocket to reach space.
- 10 September 1982 or 16 June 1983 – Europe's Arianespace becomes the world's first commercial launch service provider.
- 30 October 1984 – President Ronald Reagan signs the Commercial Space Launch Act of 1984, which mandates NASA to encourage private spaceflight, and authorizes the Office of Commercial Space Transportation to regulate private spaceflight in the United States.
- 15 June 1988 – PanAmSat PAS-1 becomes the first privately owned international telecommunications satellite.
- 29 March 1989 – Starfire, a repurposed Black Brant sounding rocket launched by Space Services Inc., is the first rocket to launch with a commercial launch license from the Office of Commercial Space Transportation.

== 1990s ==
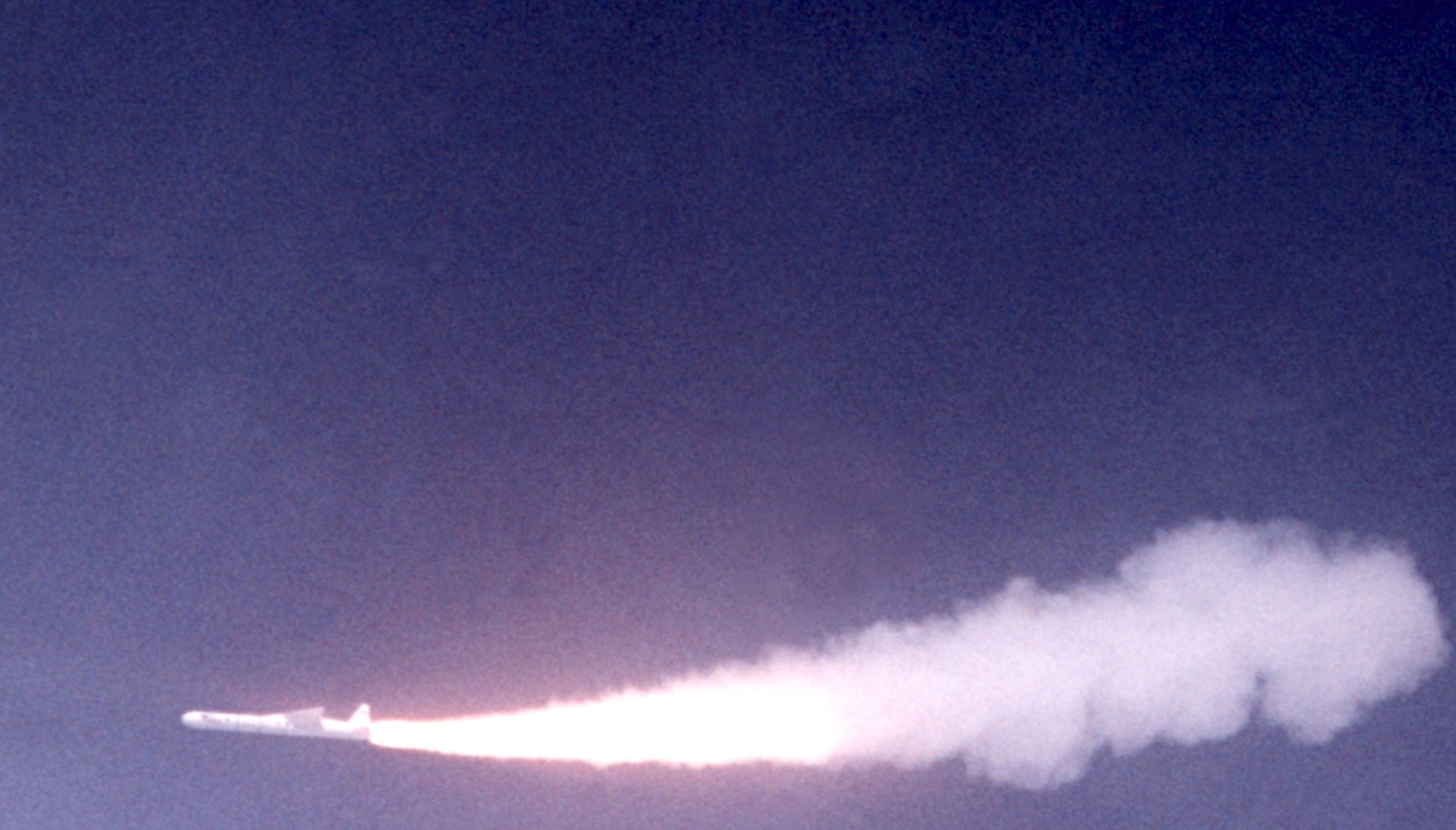
First launch of the Pegasus rocket, from a NASA-owned B-52

- 5 April 1990 – Pegasus, an air launched rocket developed by Orbital Sciences Corporation becomes the first launch vehicle fully developed by a private company to reach space, as well as the first air launched rocket of any kind to reach orbit
- 16 November 1992 – Space Flight Europe-America 500, an orbital mission consisting of a space capsule bearing gifts from Russia to the United States, is launched by the Russian company TsSKB-Progress aboard a Soyuz rocket, before landing six days later off the coast of Grays Harbor in the United States.
- November 1995 – The Office of Commercial Space Transportation is transferred to the Federal Aviation Administration (FAA), becoming the FAA Associate Administrator for Space Transportation, or FAA/AST.
- May 1996 – Creation of the Ansari X-Prize.
- 24 December 1997 – DigitalGlobe EarlyBird-1 becomes the first commercial Earth imaging satellite.
- 13 May 1998 – HGS-1, a communications satellite operated at the time by Hughes Global Services Inc., becomes the first commercial spacecraft to visit the Moon, after flying to within 6,200 km of the lunar surface on a free return trajectory to salvage it from an unusable orbit.

== 2000s ==
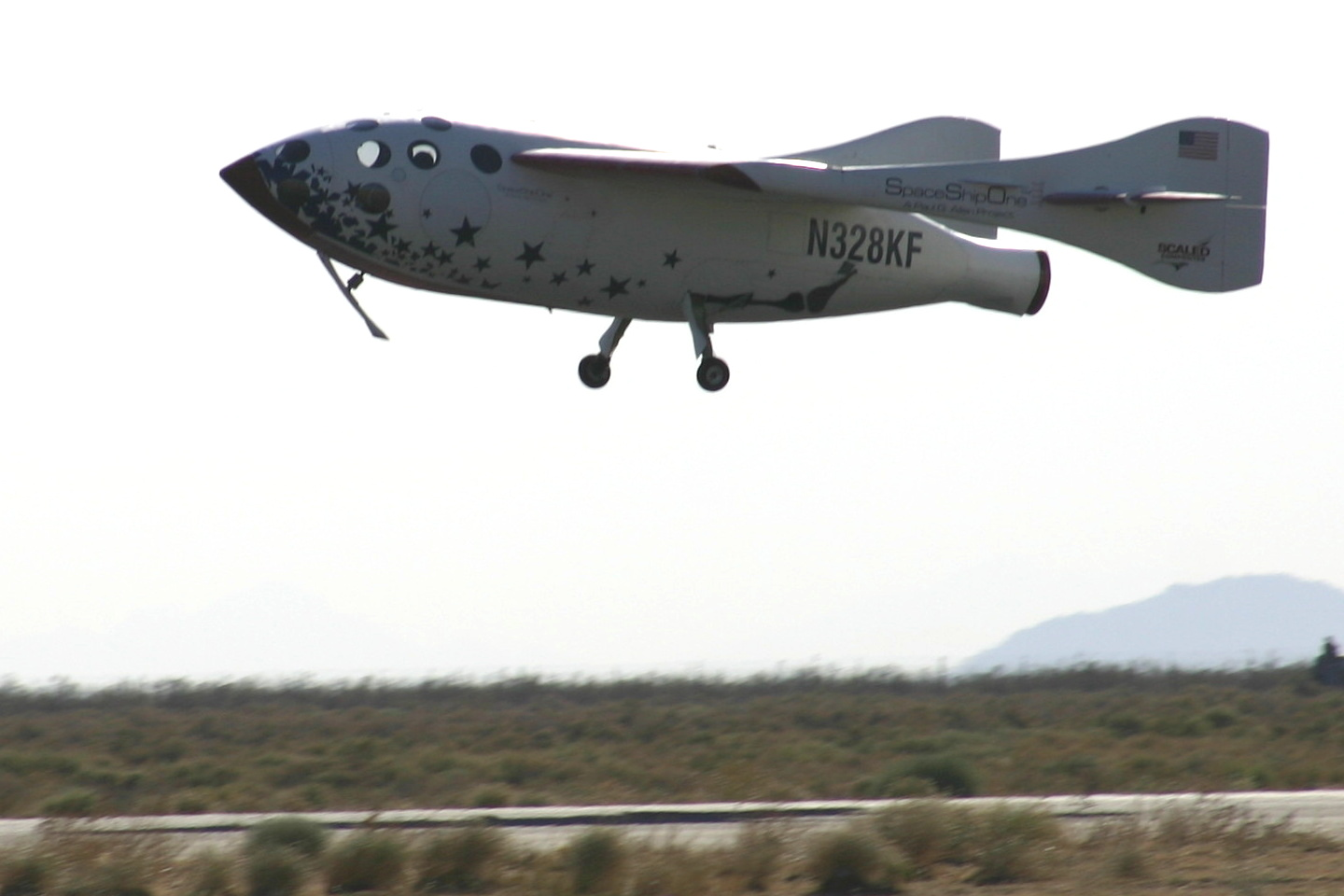
SpaceShipOne returns from its first spaceflight.

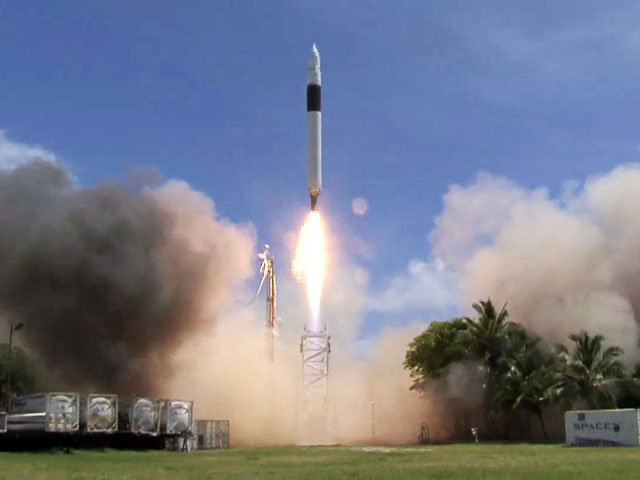
First successful launch of the Falcon 1

- 4 April 2000 – Soyuz TM-30, a crewed mission to the space station Mir arranged by the company MirCorp in collaboration with the Russian Federal Space Agency, launches, becoming the first privately funded space station expedition.
- 28 April 2001 – Dennis Tito becomes the first space tourist, launching to the International Space Station on Expedition 2 aboard a Russian Soyuz spacecraft after paying for a seat arranged by the American company Space Adventures.
- 17 May 2004 – The Civilian Space eXploration Team (CSXT) becomes the first amateur organization to send a rocket into space, with the launch of their "GoFast" rocket to 116 km (72 miles) altitude.
- 21 June 2004 – Scaled Composites’ SpaceShipOne conducts the first privately flown and funded crewed spaceflight, piloted by Mike Melvill.
- 4 October 2004 – Scaled Composites Tier One officially wins the Ansari X Prize with SpaceShipOne.
- 23 December 2004 – President George W. Bush signs the Commercial Space Launch Amendments Act of 2004, which provides a basic legal framework for commercial human spaceflight. It also creates the so-called "learning period," a temporary restriction on the FAA's ability to regulate the private spaceflight industry, which has since been extended multiple times.
- 12 July 2006 – A Russian-Ukrainian Dnepr rocket launches Genesis I, an experimental inflatable space habitat developed and owned by Bigelow Aerospace that is the first inflatable habitat module to reach orbit.
- 28 September 2008 – SpaceX conducts the first successful launch of its Falcon 1 rocket, the first privately developed fully liquid fueled rocket to reach orbit.
- 30 November 2009 - Rocketlab became the first private company in the Southern Hemisphere to reach space with the successful launch of its Ātea-1 sounding rocket.

== 2010s ==
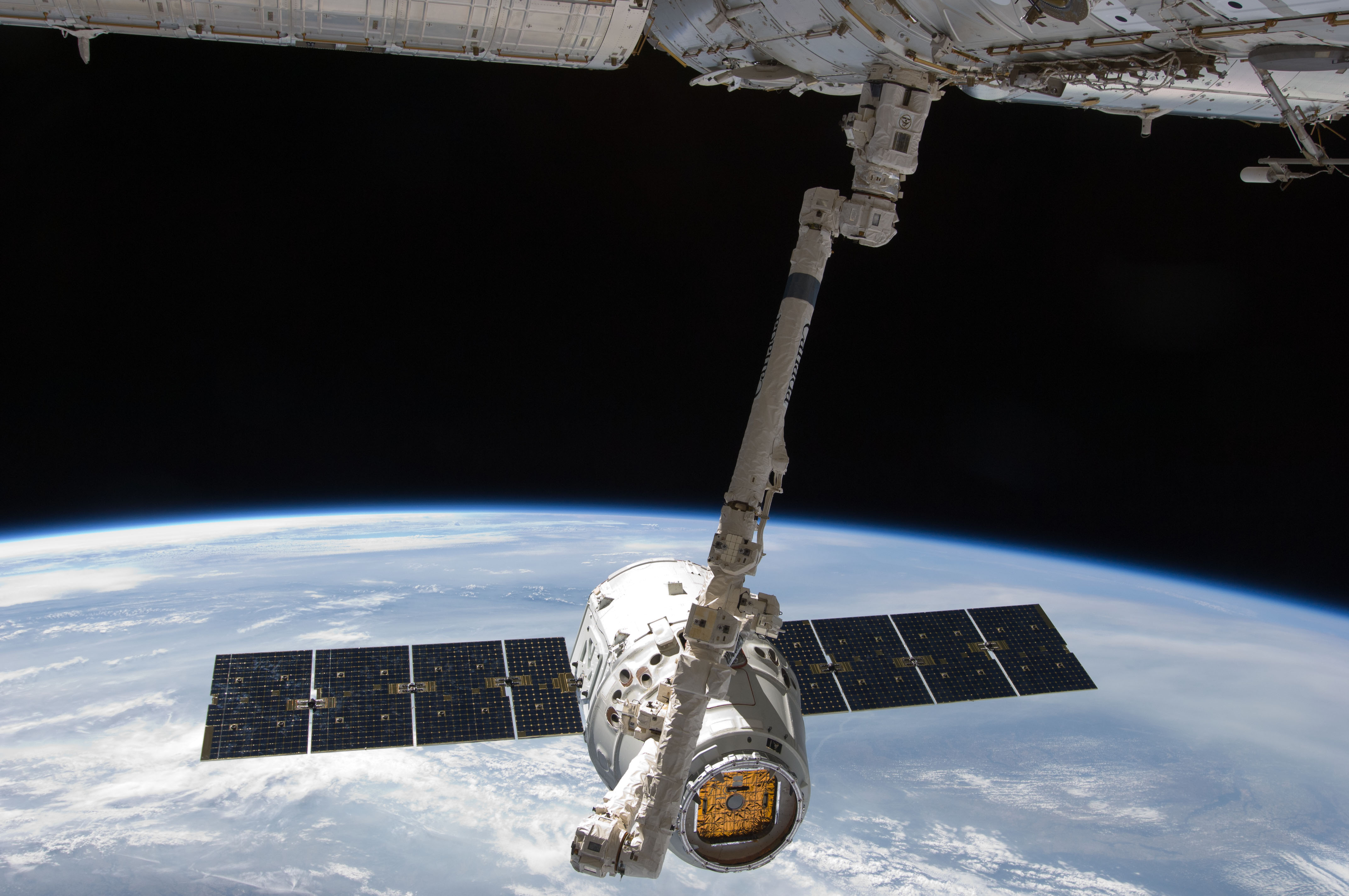
The second mission of the SpaceX Dragon capsule is berthed to the ISS.

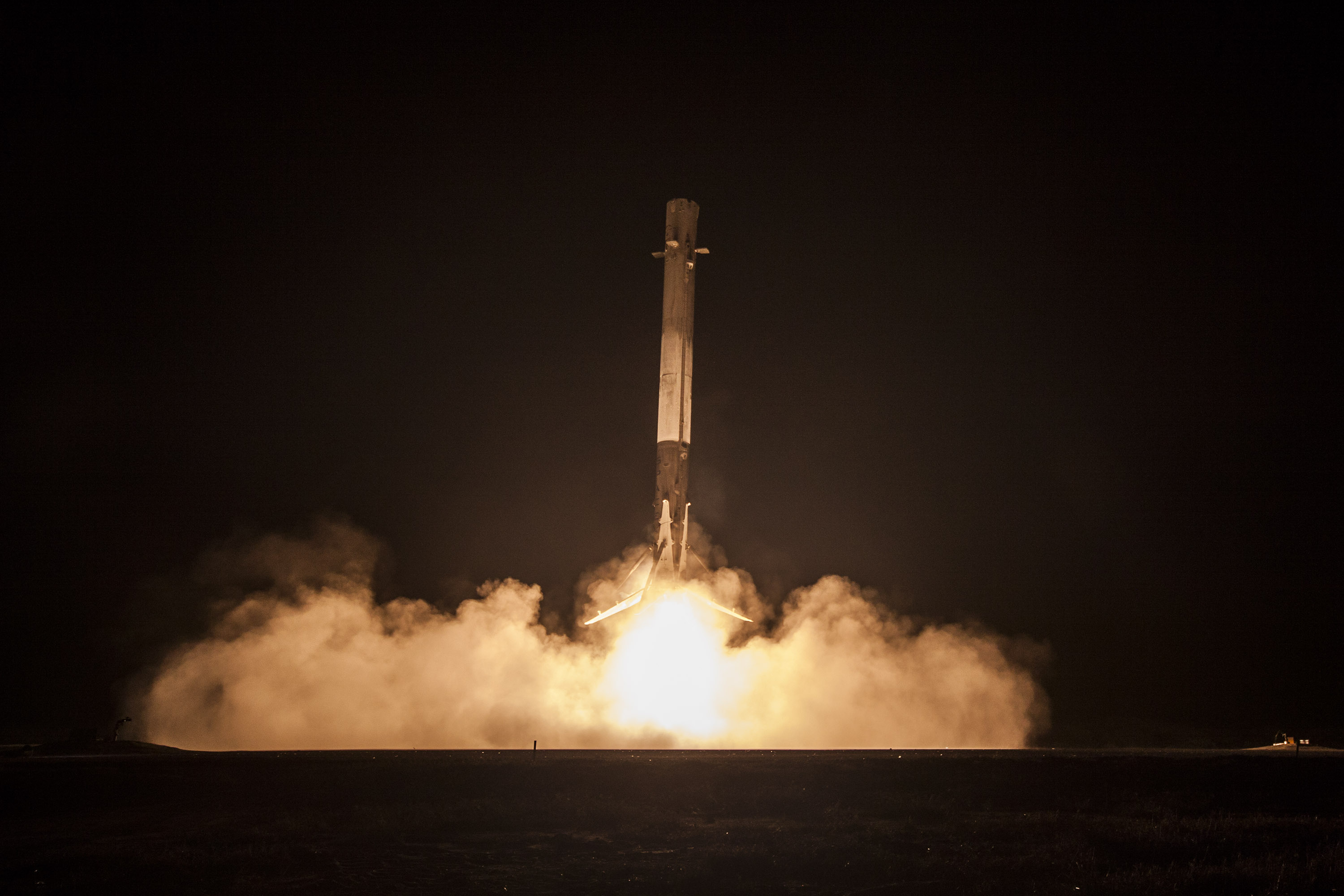
The first stage of SpaceX's Falcon 9 Flight 20 touches down at Landing Zone 1.

- 8 December 2010 – SpaceX successfully launches and recovers its Dragon capsule on its first mission, marking the first time a privately developed and operated spacecraft is recovered from orbit.
- 25 May 2012 – The second mission of SpaceX's Dragon capsule completes a successful rendezvous and berthing with the International Space Station, making it the first private spacecraft to do so.
- 3 December 2013 – SpaceX successfully launches SES-8 with its Falcon 9 rocket, marking the first time a privately developed rocket reached geostationary transfer orbit.
- May–July 2014 – A private initiative known as the ISEE-3 Reboot Project successfully contacts and takes control of NASA's defunct ISEE-3 space probe with support from NASA and the Arecibo Observatory, making them the first private group to command a spacecraft in deep space, though their plans to change the probe's orbit are abandoned weeks later when its thrusters fail to respond properly.
- 23 October 2014 – LuxSpace, an aerospace contractor based in Luxembourg, launches the Manfred Memorial Moon Mission (4M), the first commercial payload sent to fly by the Moon, attached to the third stage of the rocket that lifted Chinese lunar flyby spacecraft Chang'e 5-T1.
- 11 February 2015 – SpaceX launches NOAA's DSCOVR spacecraft to the L_{1} Lagrange point on a Falcon 9, marking the first time a privately developed rocket flew a payload beyond geostationary transfer orbit.
- 23 November 2015 – Blue Origin successfully launches its New Shepard launch system into space and lands it vertically, making it the first VTVL rocket to land on Earth from space.
- 25 November 2015 – President Barack Obama signs the U.S. Commercial Space Launch Competitiveness Act, also known as the Spurring Private Aerospace Competitiveness and Entrepreneurship Act or SPACE Act of 2015, which codifies the ability of American companies to own material resources extracted in outer space.
- 21 December 2015 – SpaceX lands the first stage of its Falcon 9 at Landing Zone 1 at Cape Canaveral, marking the first recovery of a VTVL stage from an orbital rocket.
- 22 January 2016 – Blue Origin successfully launches and lands the same New Shepard booster flown in November, making it the first VTVL rocket to reach space twice.
- 30 March 2017 – SpaceX launches SES-10, during which they successfully launch and land the first stage of a Falcon 9 that had previously flown as part of their CRS-8 mission in April 2016, making it the first VTVL rocket to be used on two orbital flights.
- 13 July 2017 – The Luxembourg Chamber of Deputies adopts a law guaranteeing companies the right to own resources extracted in space, making Luxembourg the first European nation to do so.
- 21 January 2018 – American aerospace company Rocket Lab successfully launched its Electron rocket from Mahia Launch Center on January 21, 2018 carrying three CubeSats into low Earth orbit. This was the first time that a rocket entered orbit after launching from a privately owned and operated spaceport.
- 6 February 2018 – SpaceX launches a demonstration mission on their inaugural Falcon Heavy flight, during which they marked the first privately developed rocket to reach heliocentric orbit. At that time, Falcon Heavy had the largest payload among all operational rockets, the first time this was achieved by a privately developed rocket.

== 2020s ==
Timeline of SpaceShipOne, SpaceShipTwo, CSXT and New Shepard sub-orbital flights. Where booster and capsule achieved different altitudes, the higher is plotted. In the SVG file, hover over a point to show details.

- 30 May 2020 – SpaceX successfully launches a Falcon 9 rocket carrying the Crew Dragon space capsule during the Demo-2 mission, marking the first privately developed crewed mission to orbit, the first to visit the ISS, and the first American crewed mission in general since STS-135 in 2011.
- 11 July 2021 – Virgin Galactic successfully launches Richard Branson on a SpaceShipTwo to space, marking the first privately developed crewed mission to space carrying a founder of a space company. It however did not reach the Karman Line.
- 20 July 2021 – Blue Origin successfully launches Jeff Bezos on a New Shepard rocket to space above the Karman Line, marking the first privately developed crewed mission to space with a company founder to get above the Karman Line. The mission also launched the first person born in the 21st century in space and first teenager in space (Oliver Daemen).
- 16 September 2021 – SpaceX operates the Inspiration4 mission, the first orbital spaceflight with only private citizens aboard.
- 8 April 2022 – Axiom Mission 1 by Axiom Space is the first wholly commercially operated crewed mission to the International Space Station.
- 20 April 2023 – SpaceX launches Starship, the largest and most powerful rocket to date, with twice the thrust of the Saturn V. It however fails 4 minutes into flight.
- 21 May 2023 – Axiom Mission 2 marks the first time a commercially operated crewed mission was used to fly government astronauts as well as being the first private mission with a female commander.
- 14 September 2023 – Firefly Aerospace conducts a successful orbital launch with the VICTUS NOX mission for the U.S. Space Force Space Systems Command. Firefly launched this mission 27 hours after receiving notice to launch, setting a new national security mission responsive-launch record.
- 22 February 2024 – IM-1 Odysseus marks the first successful private lunar landing and the first to do so with cryogenic propellants.
- 5 June 2024– ULA successfully launches an Atlas V rocket carrying the Boeing Starliner space capsule during the CFT mission, making Boeing the second company to launch a crewed mission to orbit and the ISS. After issues with the thrusters, Boeing and NASA decide to transfer the crew to Dragon and return Starliner uncrewed.
- 21 June 2024 - Rocket Lab's Electron becomes the fastest privately developed orbital launch vehicle to 50 launches in history.
- 10 September 2024 – Polaris Dawn gets launched and performs the first commercial extravehicular activity, as well as breaks the non-Apollo record of highest orbit flown set by Gemini 11 in 1966. It is being funded by the Polaris Program, founded by Jared Isaacman.
- 16 January 2025 - Blue Origin launches their maiden flight of their New Glenn rocket, the company's orbital launcher.
- 2 March 2025 - Blue Ghost Mission 1 of Firefly Aerospace completes a fully successful soft landing on the Moon.
- April 2025 At 01:46 (UTC), Fram2 launched aboard a SpaceX Falcon 9 rocket, becoming the first crewed spaceflight to enter a polar retrograde orbit, i.e., to fly over Earth's poles.
- September 2026 - Starship reaches orbit for the first time on Flight 14.

== Future ==
- NET 2026 – Planned launch of Rocket Lab's Venus Life Finder, an atmospheric probe anticipated to be the first private mission to another planet.
- Mid 2020s – Polaris III is a planned mission that will involve the first ever launch of SpaceX's Starship vehicle with a crew onboard, it is being funded by the Polaris Program, founded by Jared Isaacman.
- 2028 (planned) – Relativity Space's Mars science orbiter is planned to launch carrying NASA's Aeolus atmospheric science instrument suite. Relativity is responsible for the spacecraft, launch vehicle, and mission operations.

== See also ==
- Billionaire space race
- Commercialization of space
- History of spaceflight
- List of fully civilian crewed orbital spaceflights
- List of fully civilian crewed suborbital spaceflights
- Timeline of space exploration
