= Starchaser =

Starchaser may refer to:

- Starchaser: The Legend of Orin
- Starchaser Industries, a rocket company
