= Crew Dragon Resilience =

SpaceX Crew Dragon spacecraft

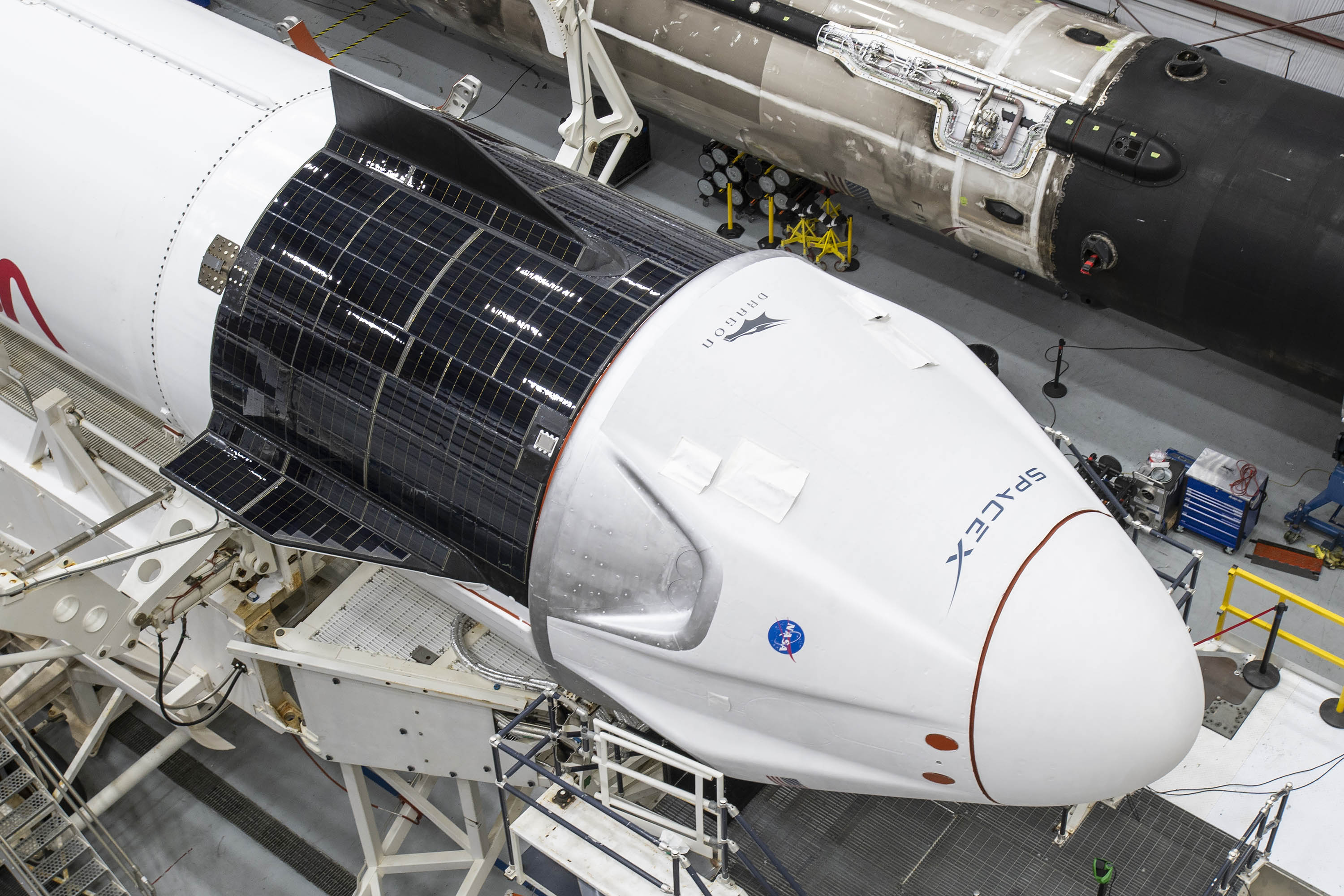
- Crew Dragon Resilience in the horizontal integration facility shortly before being rolled out to pad 39A in November 2020
- Type: Space capsule
- Class: Dragon 2
- Serial no.: C207
- Owner: SpaceX
- Manufacturer: SpaceX

Specifications
- Dimensions: 4.4 m × 3.7 m (14 ft × 12 ft)
- Power: Solar panel
- Rocket: Falcon 9 Block 5

History
- Location: California
- First flight: 16 November 2020–2 May 2021; SpaceX Crew-1
- Last flight: 1–4 April 2025; Fram2
- Flights: 4
- Flight time: 178 days, 18 hours, 17 minutes

Dragon 2s

Crew Dragon Resilience (serial number C207) is the second operational Crew Dragon reusable spacecraft manufactured and operated by SpaceX, after Endeavour. It first launched on 16 November 2020 to the International Space Station (ISS) on the SpaceX Crew-1 mission, the first operational flight of NASA's Commercial Crew Program. It was subsequently used for three private spaceflight missions with all-civilian crews: Inspiration4 in 2021, Polaris Dawn in 2024, and Fram2 in 2025.

== History ==
Originally planned to fly the mission after Crew-1, Crew Dragon C207 was reassigned to fly Crew-1 after an anomaly during a static fire test destroyed capsule C204 intended to be re-flown on the Crew Dragon In-Flight Abort Test. The spacecraft C205 intended to be used on the Demo-2 mission replaced the destroyed spacecraft for the in-flight abort test. C206 intended for use with the Crew-1 mission, was reassigned to the Demo-2 mission.

On 1 May 2020, SpaceX said that spacecraft C207 was in production and astronaut training underway. Crew Dragon C207 arrived at SpaceX processing facilities in Florida on 18 August 2020.

At a NASA press conference on 29 September 2020, commander Michael Hopkins revealed that C207 had been named Resilience. The trunk was attached and secured to the capsule on 2 October 2020 at Cape Canaveral.

Resilience was first launched on 16 November 2020 (UTC) on a Falcon 9 from the Kennedy Space Center (KSC), LC-39A, carrying NASA astronauts Michael Hopkins, Victor Glover, and Shannon Walker, and JAXA astronaut Soichi Noguchi on a six-month mission to the International Space Station.

The docking adapter, normally used to dock with the International Space Station, was replaced by a domed glass window for the Inspiration4 mission. This allows for 360-degree views of space and the Earth, similar to those provided by the Cupola Module on the ISS.

For Polaris Dawn mission, as Crew Dragon capsules lack an airlock, several modifications have been made to the interior of Resilience. Extra nitrogen and oxygen tanks have been installed, a hatch with a ladder called the "skywalker" has replaced the docking port, and the forward hatch has been motorized. To validate their procedures, Resilience underwent multiple cycles of venting and repressurization in a large vacuum chamber. The crew also spent two days in a chamber validating their pre-breathing protocol and wearing their EVA suits in a vacuum.The mission will also be the first crewed operational test of Dragon laser interlink communication via Starlink. If successful, it would potentially decrease communication latency and increase data bandwidth for human spaceflight.

On 1 April at 01:46 (UTC), Fram2 launched aboard a SpaceX Falcon 9 rocket, becoming the first crewed spaceflight to enter a polar retrograde orbit, i.e., to fly over Earth's poles. For that mission the domed window was reinstalled.

== Flights ==
List includes only completed or currently manifested missions. Dates are listed in UTC, and for future events, they are the earliest possible opportunities (also known as NET dates) and may change.

Flight No.	Mission and Patch	Launch	Landing	Duration	Remarks	Crew	Outcome
1	Crew-1	16 November 2020, 00:27:17	2 May 2021, 06:56:33	167 days, 6 hours, 29 minutes	Long-duration mission. Ferried four members of the Expedition 64/65 crew to the ISS. First operational flight of the Commercial Crew Program.	Michael Hopkins; Victor Glover; Soichi Noguchi; Shannon Walker	Success
2	Inspiration4 (patch 1 and 2)	16 September 2021, 00:02:56	18 September 2021, 23:06:49	2 days, 23 hours, 3 minutes	The first fully private, all-civilian orbital flight. Crew reached a 585 km (364 mi) orbit and conducted science experiments and public outreach activities for three days. First standalone orbital Crew Dragon flight and the first flight with the cupola.	Jared Isaacman; Sian Proctor; Hayley Arceneaux; Christopher Sembroski	Success
3	Polaris Dawn (patch)	10 September 2024, 09:23:49	15 September 2024, 07:36:54	4 days, 22 hours, 13 minutes	Fully private orbital flight, including two SpaceX employees. First of three planned flights of the private Polaris Program. The highest orbital altitude achieved, 1,400 km (870 mi) away from Earth, was the highest ever flown by a crewed spacecraft since the Apollo program. Isaacman and Gillis later made the first commercial spacewalk during the mission.	Jared Isaacman; Scott Poteet; Sarah Gillis; Anna Menon	Success
4	Fram2 (patch)	1 April 2025, 01:46:50	4 April 2025, 16:19:28	3 days, 14 hours, 32 minutes	Fully private, all-civilian orbital flight. First crewed mission ever launched into polar orbit.	Chun Wang; Jannicke Mikkelsen; Eric Philips; Rabea Rogge	Success
