= Oliver Ullrich =

German-born Swiss aerospace physician and gravitational biologist

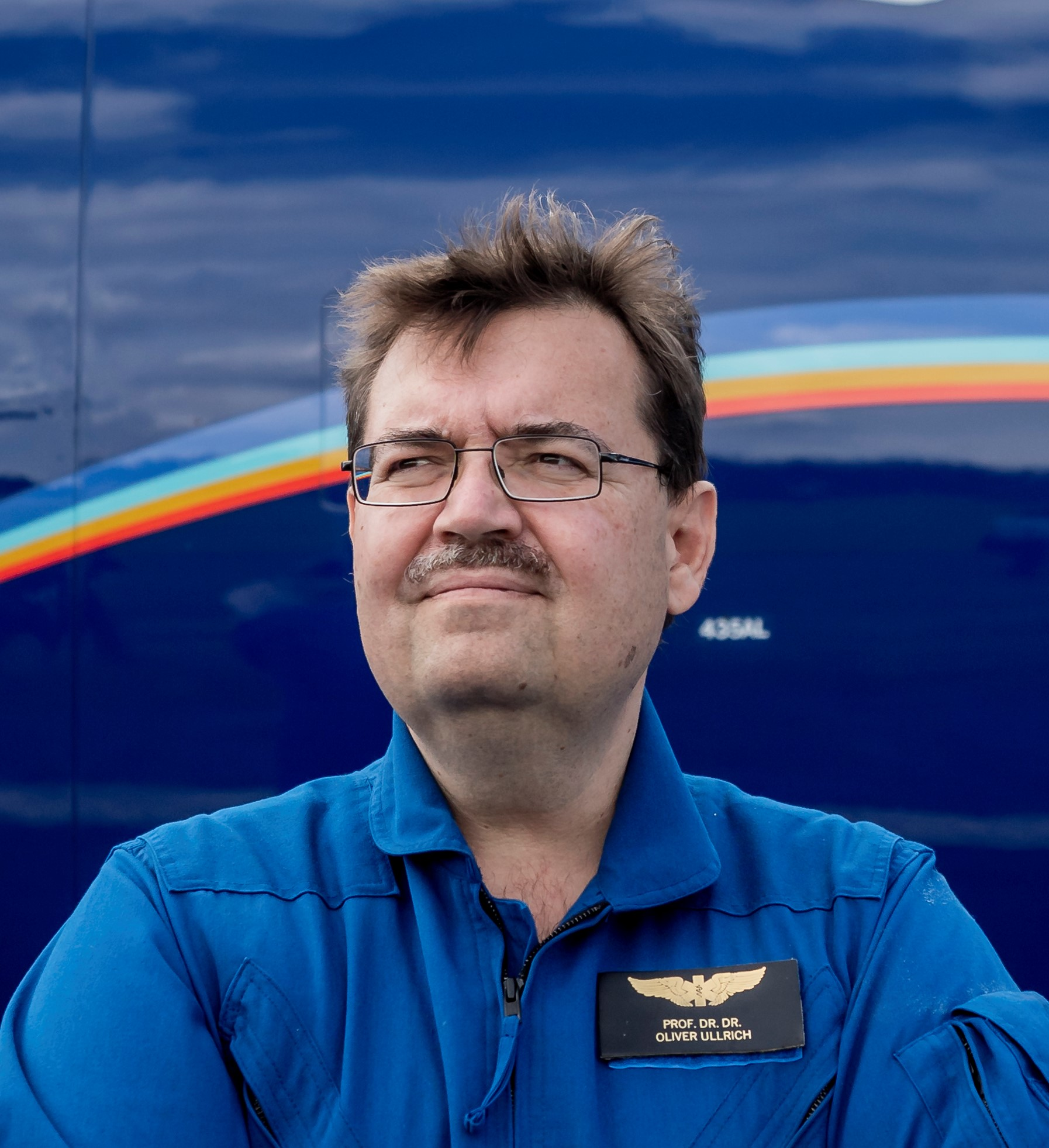
- Ullrich in 2020
- Born: July 9, 1970 (age 56); Berlin, West Germany
- Occupations: Aerospace physician, gravitational biologist, university professor

Oliver Ullrich (born July 9, 1970) is a German-born Swiss aerospace physician and gravitational biologist. He is a full professor at University of Zurich and director of the Institute of Aerospace Medicine. Since 2024, he has been the Chairman Director of the newly founded Center for Space and Aviation Switzerland and Liechtenstein. In this role, he signed the memorandum of understanding with Starlab and the Foundation Switzerland Innovation Park Zurich for operating the Starlab ground segment at the Innovation Park. He is also the architect of the collaboration between Space Florida and the CSA, which was launched in June 2025. Since 2018, he has been the director of the Innovation Cluster Space and Aviation at the University of Zurich (UZH Space Hub).

== Life ==
Ullrich studied medicine and biochemistry at Freie Universität Berlin from 1989 to 1996. Ullrich is said to have been the first West German student assistant in the GDR after the fall of the Berlin Wall in late 1996. He received his doctorate in 1998 from the Humboldt-Universität zu Berlin. He also earned a doctorate from the Freie Universität Berlin. In 2002, he earned his postdoctoral qualification (habilitation) in anatomy and cell biology at the Charité. In December 2003, he was appointed professor for molecular immunology and later for space biotechnology at the Otto-von-Guericke-Universität Magdeburg.

As a professor of medicine, Ullrich started research activities in space medicine in the 2000s. In 2007, he was appointed honorary professor for space biotechnology at the Faculty of Mechanical Engineering at the Otto-von-Guericke-Universität Magdeburg. In 2019, he was named honorary professor for space medicine at the Ernst-Abbe-Hochschule Jena, where he teaches students to interdisciplinary product development for space missions. In September 2007, he assumed the position of full professor for anatomy at the Institute of Anatomy of the University of Zurich in Switzerland. On January 1, 2025, he was appointed Full Professor and Chair of Aerospace Medicine and Director of the Institute for Aerospace Medicine at the University of Zurich. He is also Adjunct Professor at Beijing Institute of Technology (BIT) (BIT) in China. Since January 1, 2025, he is also Professor of Aerospace Medicine at the Private University in the Principlaity of Liechtenstein (UFL).

Together with Cora Thiel, chief scientist in the Ullrich group, he developed a method for producing human tissues from adult stem cells in space in a public-private partnership with Airbus Defence and Space. These tissues are intended for research and development, the replacement of animal experiments, and transplantation. Ullrich advocates for the new space economy and is co-founder of the startup companies Dovespace in Burgdorf, Switzerland, and Star Sailors in Liechtenstein.

Ullrich is the president of the Swiss SkyLab Foundation which carries out the Swiss Parabolic Flight Programs.

== Research ==
Ullrich investigates gravitational biology and focuses particularly on the molecular adaptation of human cells to varying gravity conditions. His goal is to understand how human cells perceive gravity and how they adapt to changes in gravitational forces. He investigates the gravitational behavior of immune cells and other cells on different research platforms such as: parabolic flights, suborbital rockets, and the International Space Station. He also conducted an orbital experiment in the German-Chinese space project Simbox on Shenzhou 8. In a 2017 study conducted with Cora Thiel on the ISS, Ullrich demonstrated that mammalian immune cells fully adapt to microgravity in under a minute. Ullrich and his team also found rapid adaptation processes in other cell types. Together with Cora Thiel, he discovered that the rapid genomic response to altered gravitational forces is encoded in the organization of the chromatin. In 2025 Ullrich and Thiel had a Space Genomics experiment on board of the FRAM2 mission, the first non-US private Space Mission. As the initiators of a Swiss-Caribbean space cooperation, Ullrich and Cora Thiel led the first space mission from St. Kitts and Nevis in late May 2026. The life sciences experiment, developed under Ullrich’s scientific direction, was launched on the SubOrbital Express mission S1X-5/M17 at Esrange and marks the first Caribbean nation’s participation in international space exploration.

In 2015, Ullrich founded the Magdeburg Research Group for Space and Microgravity Conditions (MARS) at Otto-von-Guericke-Universität Magdeburg. In 2016, he was elected to the board of the German Society for Aerospace Medicine (DGLRM), and in 2019, he became its vice president, and in 2022, its president. Additionally, he is involved in several other international space committees. Furthermore, Ullrich is the director of the UZH Space Hub, an innovation platform of University of Zurich. In 2020, he organized the world's first parabolic flight campaign under pandemic conditions at Dübendorf Military Airport.

Ullrich is a co-editor of various scientific journals, including Acta Astronautica. As of 2025, his total mission experience includes 17 parabolic flights, 9 suborbital, and 9 orbital missions.

== Awards ==
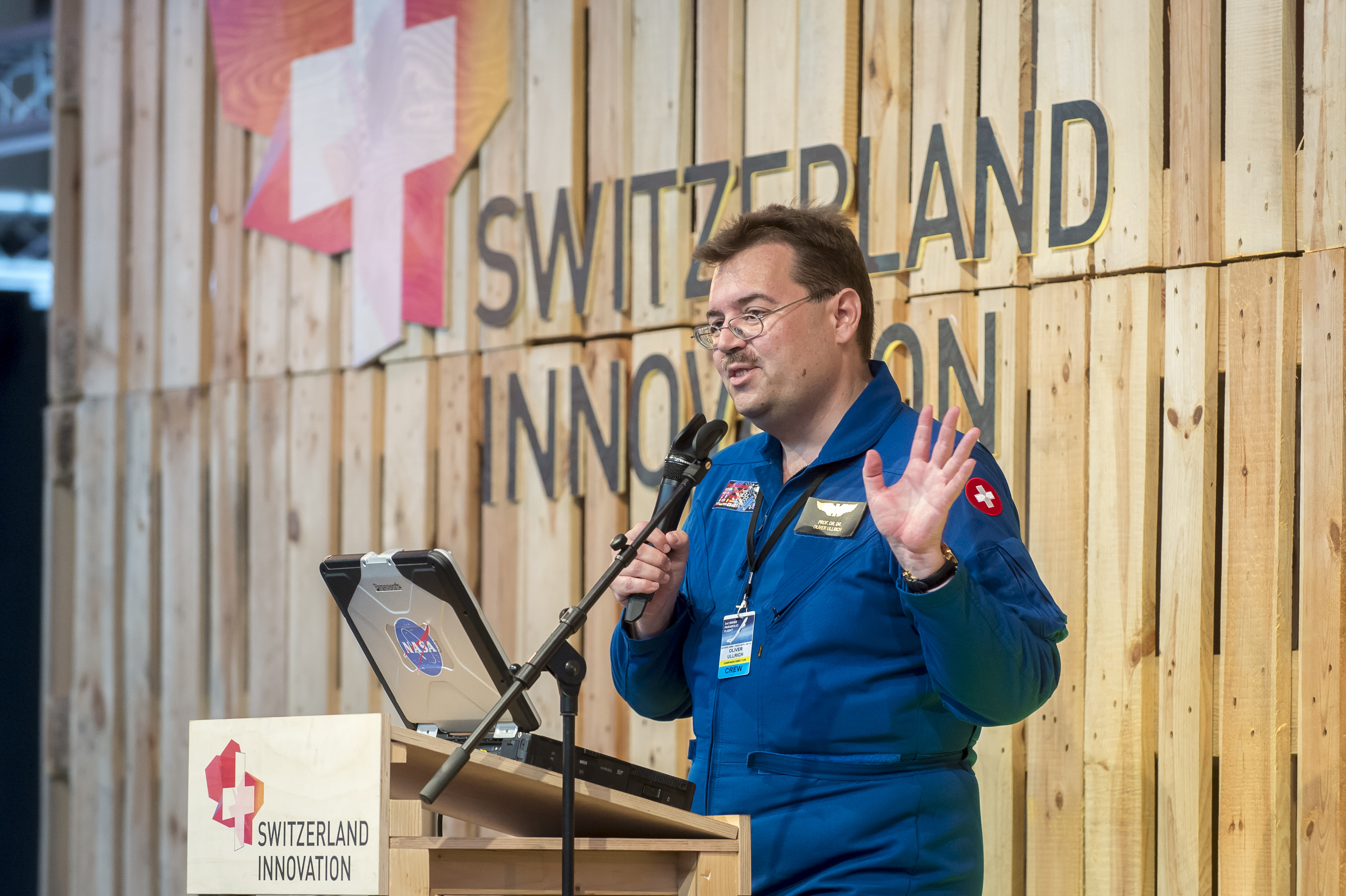
Ullrich in 2018

In 2012, Ullrich was elected a lifetime member of the International Academy of Astronautics. In 2018, Ullrich and Cora Thiel were honored with the Albrecht-Ludwig-Berblinger Science Award from the European School of Aviation Medicine for their research paper "Rapid adaptation of microgravity in mammalian macrophage cells". On October 1, 2023, Ullrich was honored with the Life Science Award by the International Academy of Astronautics.

== Further activities ==
Together with Air Force officer and physician Marc Studer, he initiated and led the development of a microgravity research platform aboard a Swiss Air Force fighter jet. With Natalie Dove, he established the Swiss Parabolic Flight Program, which enabled research flights with the A310 ZERO-G from Dübendorf Military Airport by combining scientific teams with industry and private individuals, without use of public funds.

Together with Cora Thiel, Ullrich proved in an experiment in 2011 that DNA can survive the space environment and re-entry into the Earth's atmosphere and still remain functional. The publication of this study in 2014 received widespread attention.

Additionally, Ullrich holds a postgraduate degree in theology from the Pontifical Lateran University in Rome since 2020 and sees his work at the intersection of faith and natural sciences.

Ullrich is a proponent of the New Space Economy, which refers to the private sector's utilization of low Earth orbit, including the production of goods that cannot be manufactured, or can only be produced in lower quality, under the Earth's gravitational conditions.
