= Chun Wang =

Maltese investor

- 王纯
- Born: 1982 (age 43–44); Tianjin, China
- Citizenship: China (until 2017); Saint Kitts (since 2017); Malta (since 2023)
- Known for: Cryptocurrency; Private astronaut aboard Fram2
- Relatives
- Space career

Commercial astronaut
- Time in space: 3 days, 14 hours, 32 minutes
- Missions: Fram2

Chun Wang (Chinese: 王纯; pinyin: Wáng Chún) is a Chinese-born Maltese-Kittitian cryptocurrency investor who co-founded F2Pool, one of the first Bitcoin mining pools in China.

== Life and career ==
Born around 1982, Wang was born in Tianjin, China. He first travelled beyond his hometown in his early 20s, and his first trip abroad he was 28. Dropping out of university, he held several software programming jobs in China. In 2011, he borrowed $40,000 from his father to invest in early cryptocurrency ventures, experiencing financial loss in the first months. He had made gains by 2013, co-founding F2Pool. He launched the crypto venture Stakefish in 2018. For a time, F2Pool was the world's largest bitcoin mining operation.

== Private spaceflight ==
On March 31 (April 1 UTC), 2025 the Fram2 mission of a Crew Dragon spacecraft was successfully launched. It was the first human flight to go a polar retrograde orbit, i.e., to fly over Earth's poles. The mission lasted 3.5 days, ending on 4 April 2025 at 16:19:28 UTC (9:19:28 a.m. PDT, local time at the landing site). It was the first Pacific splashdown for a Crew Dragon mission.

Fram2 was privately funded and commanded by Wang, and operated by SpaceX with a Crew Dragon spacecraft. In addition to Wang, it flew his all-civilian crew — Jannicke Mikkelsen, Rabea Rogge and Eric Philips. He had conceived the idea of a polar spaceflight in 2023, proposing it to SpaceX. The crew conducted 22 experiments focused on human health and space exploration technology, including the first X-ray in space. A Maltese citizen since August 2023, he became the first person from Malta to travel to space. It was also the first time non-Americans participated in a civilian spaceflight. He and the crew spent two months of training at SpaceX headquarters in California. Wang, outlining a goal to visit every country on earth, scheduled the space trip to be his 1,000th flight.

On May 21, 2026, Wang announced that he was going on the first manned interplanetary mission to Mars, which will last two years and fly by the planet without landing. He also plans to participate in a lunar mission alongside Dennis Tito at an unspecified date.

== Personal life ==
He moved to Thailand in 2015, then to South Korea. He has been a citizen of Malta since August 2023 and Saint Kitts and Nevis since 2017.
