= Fram2 =

First crewed polar orbit spaceflight

- Artist's rendering of Crew Dragon Resilience during Fram2
- Mission type: Private spaceflight
- Operator: SpaceX
- COSPAR ID: 2025-066A
- SATCAT no.: 63427
- Website: f2.com
- Mission duration: 3 days, 14 hours and 32 minutes

Spacecraft properties
- Spacecraft: Crew Dragon Resilience
- Spacecraft type: Crew Dragon
- Manufacturer: SpaceX

Crew
- Crew size: 4
- Members: Chun Wang; Jannicke Mikkelsen; Rabea Rogge; Eric Philips

Start of mission
- Launch date: 1 April 2025, 01:46:50 UTC (31 March, 9:46:50 p.m. EDT)
- Rocket: Falcon 9 Block 5 (B1085‑6), Flight 454
- Launch site: Kennedy, LC‑39A

End of mission
- Recovered by: MV Shannon
- Landing date: 4 April 2025, 16:19:28 UTC (9:19:28 a.m. PDT)
- Landing site: Pacific Ocean near Oceanside, California (33.0°N 117.7°W)

Orbital parameters
- Reference system: Geocentric orbit
- Regime: Polar orbit (retrograde)
- Perigee altitude: 202 km (126 mi)
- Apogee altitude: 413 km (257 mi)
- Inclination: 90.01°
- Period: 93 minutes, 10 seconds
- Mission insignia Crew Dragon flights

Fram2 was a private human spaceflight mission operated by SpaceX with a Crew Dragon spacecraft on behalf of entrepreneur Chun Wang. During the mission, Wang and his all-civilian crew—Jannicke Mikkelsen, Rabea Rogge and Eric Philips—were launched into a polar orbit, a first for a human spaceflight mission. During the three-day mission, the crew conducted scientific research.

== Crew ==
The crew of Fram2 was announced in August 2024.

Position	Crew
Mission commander (Note: Wang was in command of the mission, Mikkelsen was in command of the spacecraft with the traditional operating duties given to a typical NASA commander)	(Malta) (Saint Kitts and Nevis) Chun Wang; First spaceflight
Vehicle commander	(Norway) Jannicke Mikkelsen; First spaceflight
Pilot	(Germany) Rabea Rogge; First spaceflight
Mission specialist Medical officer	(Australia) Eric Philips; First spaceflight

== Mission ==
Launch of Fram2

The mission studied the Earth's poles and their space environment. It was a free-flight mission of the Crew Dragon spacecraft, which was equipped with the panoramic cupola attachment that first flew on Inspiration4.

Initially, Crew Dragon Endurance was selected for this flight, because it shares its name with Ernest Shackleton's Antarctic exploration vessel. Due to changes in the Crew Dragon manifest, however, Endurance was assigned to Crew-10, and it was decided to fly Fram2 using Resilience. The mission launched from Launch Complex 39A at the Kennedy Space Center on 1 April 2025 at 01:46:50 UTC (31 March, 9:46:50 p.m. EDT, local time at the launch site).

The mission is named Fram2 in reference and succession to the Norwegian polar exploration ship Fram, the first to complete expeditions to both the North Pole and South Pole between 1893 and 1912. The crew carried a piece of the ship's teak deck to space.

The mission entered a low Earth orbit with an apogee of 413 km (257 mi) and a perigee of 202 km (126 mi) with a polar retrograde inclination of 90.01°, making it fly over both of Earth's poles. It broke the previous record for highest orbital inclination of a crewed spaceflight set by Vostok 6 in 1963.

Because of the unique launch to the south, the software on the Dragon spacecraft was updated with new abort scenarios that would propel the capsule away from populated areas in Florida, Cuba, Panama and Peru to make a water landing.

The crew planned to observe and study aurora-like phenomena such as STEVE and green fragments and conduct experiments on the human body, including the first X-ray of a human in space. The crew also attempted to grow oyster mushrooms, the first mushrooms to be grown in space. Rogge planned a series of slow-scan television image transmissions over amateur radio targeted to educational groups competing in an event called Fram2Ham. Rogge also executed the Swiss-Nevisian biological experiment "Space Genomics" by Swiss Oliver Ullrich and Cora Thiel.

Dr. Christopher Combs, the associate dean of research at the Klesse College of Engineering and Integrated Design at the University of Texas at San Antonio, described the mission as, "a notch above a gimmick, but not exactly a groundbreaking milestone", with the planned experiments described as offering limited scientific value and able to be conducted regardless of the flight path. However, for the crew members, each with ties to polar exploration, the mission holds personal significance.

The mission concluded with a splashdown in the Pacific Ocean off the coast of Oceanside, California on 4 April 2025 at 16:19:28 UTC (9:19:28 a.m. PDT, local time at the landing site). It was the first Pacific splashdown for a Crew Dragon mission. While SpaceX Dragon 1 cargo missions previously landed in the Pacific, recovery operations shifted to the Eastern U.S. in 2019 to expedite the return of astronauts and critical cargo to Kennedy Space Center. However, this adjustment had an unintended consequence: the trunk module, jettisoned before reentry, was expected to burn up in the atmosphere, yet at least four instances of trunk debris being found on land were reported. During this Pacific Ocean splashdown, the trunk remained attached longer and was directed toward a remote area of the ocean called Point Nemo (nicknamed the spacecraft cemetery), where any debris that survives reentry will be unlikely to cause damage.

== See also ==
- STS-62-A, a cancelled Space Shuttle mission intended to launch into polar orbit.
- List of fully civilian crewed orbital spaceflights
