= Starchaser Industries =

British space tourism company

Starchaser Industries Ltd
- Starchaser mission badge
- Formation: 1998
- Legal status: Private company
- Purpose: Commercial Space Access/ Space Tourism and Educational Outreach
- Location: Unit 7, Hyde Point, Dunkirk Lane, Hyde, Greater Manchester, SK14 4NL
- Region served: UK
- Chief Executive: Steve Bennett
- Website: Starchaser Industries

Starchaser Industries is a privately owned space tourism company based in the UK. Formed in 1992, the company designed and built several prototype rocket systems for space tourism vehicles. Starchaser's rocket NOVA 1 launched in 2001 from Morecambe Bay. The vehicle holds the UK record for the biggest successful rocket launch fired from the British mainland. Starchaser operate an Educational Outreach Programme that aims to take areas of physics and chemistry and explain their use in rocket building.

== History ==
The creator of Starchaser Foundation, Steve Bennett of Dukinfield was a laboratory technician at Colgate. Later, Steve taught at the University of Salford as a part-time lecturer of Space Physics. Colgate initially sponsored his project and was later aided by Salford University. The Starchaser Foundation was created in March 1996. The company was sponsored by Tate & Lyle as the first rockets were powered by sugar.

In December 1998 the foundation become a private limited company known as Starchaser Industries. Engines were tested in 1999 at the Altcar Rifle Range in Merseyside. It moved to new premises in Hyde in January 2001. The company was sponsored by Microsoft and the Discovery Channel and it employed twelve people.

On 22 November 2001, Starchaser 4 was launched from Morecambe Bay as a full-scale, non-space test of its rocket systems. The rocket flew below 10,000 feet to comply with UK Civil Aviation Authority rules. Starchaser 4 flew to a height of approximately 5,538 feet before parachuting down into the bay. In 2001 Starchaser 4 was the biggest rocket ever fired from the UK mainland. The rocket was originally intended to be reusable but was damaged on landing.

In 2002 work began on NOVA 2 the progenitor rocket system to Starchaser's intended Space tourism Vehicle Thunderstar. The aim of this mission was to focus on the capsule and life-supporting systems of the rocket. In 2004 there were successful tests of the NOVA 2 capsule's landing gear to investigate methods of recovery of the capsule from land. On 1 July 2008, the 57-foot Nova 2 was unveiled to the public and toured around the UK. As of June 2022, the NOVA 2 still remains unlaunched.

== Crewed spaceflight ==
In June 2001, the company unveiled the 33 foot Nova crewed rocket in which it planned to provide single, crewed spaceflight by 2003 with plans for another rocket called the Thunderstar launching from New Mexico in 2005. None of these plans came to fruition.

Starchaser hoped to launch crewed missions from the UK but due to the UK CAA flight restrictions, Starchaser ultimately decided on the purchase of 25 acres of land with buildings at Spaceport America in Las Cruces, New Mexico, next to the White Sands Missile Range. As of June 2022, these plans seem to have been abandoned.

In 2006, the uncrewed Skybolt rocket was unveiled. Since being unveiled, the rocket has been touring schools in the UK in order to generate funds for the company.

== Rockets ==
Below is a list of key rocket tests Starchaser has undertaken as well as their outcome.

=== Launched Rockets ===
Rocket	Date and time (UTC)	Launch site	Mission outcome
Starchaser 1	1 November 1993	Bickerton, Cheshire	Failure
Starchaser 1	Flew to 2,400 feet, where its parachutes failed to open and ended in a crash.		
Starchaser 1A	23 May 1995	Sarn, Wales	Success
Starchaser 1A	An upgraded Starchaser 1 rocket and fully completed its objectives. Recovered by parachute.		
Starchaser 2	2 February 1996	Otterburn, Northumberland	Success
Starchaser 2	This was then the largest civilian rocket ever launched in Europe, and reached 1,890 feet; below the 3,000 feet planned. It was powered by sugar and sponsored by Tate & Lyle. The rocket operated as intended.		
LEXX (Starchaser 3)	7 February 1997	Otterburn, Northumberland	Success
LEXX (Starchaser 3)	Starchaser 3 was sponsored by Pearson New Entertainment to promote their "Lexx" science fiction series. LEXX reached an altitude of 15,673 feet and became the first Starchaser rocket to break the sound barrier. Unfortunately, contact with the rocket was lost. It is suspected that the rocket was swept away by strong winds.		
Starchaser 3	20 March 1998	Okehampton, Devon	Failure
Starchaser 3	A rocket motor misfired shortly after launch and the rocket impacted the ground shortly after takeoff, starting off a large fire.		
TEMPEST	5 March 1999	Altcar, Mersyside	Success
TEMPEST	Tempest became the first Starchaser rocket to have a marine recovery. Successful launch.		
Starchaser 3a	20 August 1999	Cartmel Wharf, Morecambe Bay	Success
Starchaser 3a	A height of 22 feet and reached an altitude of 20,000 feet with nine rocket motors; this was in close co-operation with the University of Salford. Generated over 4 tonnes of thrust.		
Sharp 1	2 May 2000	Morecambe Bay	Success
Sharp 1	Flown to a height of over 18,000 feet and had nearly 5 seconds of supersonic flight. Recovered safely.		
Discovery	6 July 2000	Morecambe Bay	Success
Discovery	The world's first privately funded fully re-usable two stage research rocket. Sponsorship for this rocket came from The Discovery Channel. Flew to a maximum altitude of 19,000 feet and was recovered safely.		
Starchaser 4 'NOVA'	22 November 2001	Morecambe Bay	Success
Starchaser 4 'NOVA'	The sole test flight reached about 5,000 feet; it is the largest rocket launched from British soil.		
SHARP 4	14 April 2002	Morecambe Bay	Success
SHARP 5	14 April 2002	Morecambe Bay	Success
TEMPEST 4	21 September 2015	Capesthorne Hall, Cheshire	Success
TEMPEST 4	Instrumentation provided by the University of Chester, University of Sheffield and the University of Manchester.		
Skybolt 2	11 September 2017	Otterburn, Northumberland	Success
Skybolt 2	Reached 4,000 feet, met all objectives.		

=== Unlaunched Rockets ===
- Skybolt – Unveiled on 28 September 2006 at the University of Salford, this scale model of the space tourism vehicle was originally intended to be an intermediate test vehicle also capable of being used as a reusable sounding rocket. The Storm engine has test fired on two separate occasions, but the rocket has never been launched, and now tours with Starchaser's educational outreach team.

== Education ==
The company operate an Educational Outreach Programme called SPACE4SCHOOLS, for schools and other similar entities in the UK. Using real examples of rockets and scientific principles, the programme aims to excite and inspire pupils to get interested in Science and Engineering. Some of the main purposes of the program is to engage students in activities where they can design and modify their own science experiments. The purpose of these activities is to help pupils develop their research abilities, to collect data and verify their hypothesis.

The outreach side of Starchaser contributes extensively to their much-needed funding. From 2005 onwards, due to the amount of money needed to continue research and development on the rockets increasing rapidly, the tour of schools became a more important part of the company. The Skybolt 2 rocket which was successfully launched on 11 September 2017 toured thousands of schools.

== Sponsorship ==
Over the years of its existence, Starchaser Industries has been co-operating with many companies and institutions, including:

- WEST System: Supplier of Epoxy, the primary material of all Rockets launched by Starchaser Industries
- HMG Paints Limited: Provided the Paint for the Starchaser 4 'NOVA' and the SHARP Series of rockets
- Dabs.com: Various Computer Hardware

== Legal issues ==
In 2002 Steven Bennet took legal action against the BBC corporately (and Dr David Whitehouse, the BBC's award-winning science correspondent, personally. Such personal action was not legally required.) in response to a critical article written by Whitehouse. Bennet claimed that the article contained a number of errors and false allegations. The BBC defended its article robustly pointing out the absurdities of many of Mr Bennett's claims. Just before the trial, scheduled for July 2003 Starchaser backed down and said they would withdraw their case if the BBC agreed to pay Starchaser's costs. The BBC was prepared to go to court, especially given Starchaser's lack of confidence in their case, but in the interests of saving licence fee payer's money agreed to pay Starchaser's costs. The BBC did not issue Starchaser with an apology and continues to stand by its article, recently noting that 18 years after the original article Starchaser are no closer to getting into space.

In 2014, it became known that a bookkeeper which had worked six years for the company had committed fraud by forging hundreds of money transfers to suppliers that never happened, diverting the funds to their own bank account. A total of £167,000 was stolen from the company. The crime was finally discovered when Starchaser Industries received debt letters from their landlords concerning money she allegedly had paid.

== See also ==
- List of private spaceflight companies
