= Rabea Rogge =

German electrical engineer and polar scientist

- Born: 28 January 1996 (age 30); Berlin, Germany
- Education: ETH Zurich
- Occupations: Electrical engineer, robotics researcher, polar scientist
- Known for: Private astronaut aboard Fram2
- Website: ntnu.edu/employees/rabea.rogge

Rabea Patricia Rogge (born 28 January 1996) is an electrical engineer, robotic researcher, polar scientist and private astronaut who flew on the SpaceX Crew Dragon Resilience, as part of the Fram2 mission. She is the first female German astronaut.

== Biography ==
Rabea was born in Berlin and studied in Zürich, specializing in arctic robotics. She obtained her bachelor degree and master degree in electrical engineering at ETH Zurich, currently pursuing PhD from the Norwegian University of Science and Technology in the Department of Marine Technology, where her research topic is Data-driven navigation, guidance and control for autonomous surface vehicles in harsh conditions. She has also been a member of the Swiss Academic Spaceflight Initiative (ARIS) and led a satellite mission.

== Private spaceflight ==
In April 2025, Rogge flew to space as the mission specialist of the Fram2 mission of a SpaceX Crew Dragon spacecraft, the first human flight to a polar orbit. i.e., to fly over Earth's poles. During the mission, Rogge made their first amateur radio contact from a Dragon capsule with TU Berlin, and conducted a STEM activity using SSTV in partnership with Amateur Radio on the International Space Station.. Rogge holds amateur radio callsigns LB9NJ and KD3AID.

== Publications ==
In April 2026, Rogge published her first book, Ein (bisschen) Weltraum für Alle: Gedanken einer Astronautin zu Expeditionen, Robotern und Zukunftsvisionen ("A (Little) Space for Everyone: Thoughts of an Astronaut on Expeditions, Robots and Visions of the Future"), released by Springer. In the book, she traces her path as an engineer and astronaut, recounts her training and the Fram2 mission, and reflects on the opening up of the astronaut profession to private individuals as well as on the future of robotic exploration. An English translation, titled A (Little) Space for Everyone: An Astronaut's Thoughts on Robots, Exploration and the Meaning of It All, is scheduled for release in October 2026.
