= Jannicke Mikkelsen =

Norwegian cinematographer (born 1986)

Jannicke Jane Mikkelsen
- Born: June 8, 1986 (age 40); Edinburgh, Scotland
- Education: National Film and Television School
- Occupations: Film Director and cinematographer
- Known for: Private astronaut aboard Fram2
- Relatives
- Space career

Commercial astronaut
- Time in space: 3 days, 14 hours, 32 minutes
- Missions: Fram2
- Website: jannickemikkelsen.com

Jannicke Jane Mikkelsen (born June 8, 1986) is a Norwegian commercial astronaut, cinematographer, film director who has worked in the field of virtual reality (VR) cinematography, 3D animation and augmented reality technology, focusing on fringe technology and combining traditional film production with new technologies for films shot in remote areas. She's also a part of the creative collective, Group of Humans.

== Early life ==
Mikkelsen was born in Edinburgh, Scotland. At the age of 10, she had a horse riding accident that left her paraplegic for a while. She managed to regain the use of her legs. Jannicke developed an interest in 3D technology at the age of 12 during a school project on 3D mapping used by NASA. Fascinated by this technology, she began to explore stereoscopic photography and joined an online community on the subject. At the same time, after trying her hand at figure skating, she devoted herself to high-level speed skating. She studied at the National Film and Television School in Beaconsfield in the United Kingdom. She came third in the 3,000m distance at the 2005 Norwegian Allround Championships. She joined speed skating clubs, first Drammen Skøiteklub and changed later to Geithus Sports Club.

== Career in 3D Cinematography ==
In 2009, Mikkelsen became a camera operator specializing in stereoscopy and joined her colleague Florian Maier in Germany to work on 3D films. They participated in the making of films such as Vic the Viking 2: Thor's Hammer and Hansel and Gretel: Witch Hunters. Their work was twice recognized by the Advanced Imaging Society with the Lumière Award for best stereography.

== Transition to virtual reality ==
As 3D's popularity waned, Mikkelsen turned her attention to virtual reality. She continued her studies at the National Film and Television School in London, where she wrote a thesis on the history of stereoscopy. Her research led her to collaborate with Dr. Brian May, Queen's guitarist and a stereoscopic photography enthusiast.

After graduating, Mikkelsen joined Alchemy, the VR arm of Atlantic Productions, to work on immersive 360° documentaries, including David Attenborough's Great Barrier Reef. However, it was his ongoing collaboration with Brian May that marked a turning point in her career.

In 2016, Mikkelsen directed VR The Champions, an immersive 3D 360° concert of Queen. The project included a drone camera to capture the audience experience. This innovative film earned her an Imago Award.

In 2018, she created the interactive virtual reality installation Lunar Window at the Kennedy Space Center Visitor Complex, created to mark the fiftieth anniversary of Apollo 11.

In 2019, she participated as a payload specialist in the record-breaking round-the-world flight One More Orbit Mission with Terry Virts and Hamish Harding as videographer and mission data manager respectively.

In 2022, she was responsible for the visual effects of the film Stowaway.

She has also worked as a consultant for several film productions, where she has contributed expertise in advanced camera technology and visual effects.

== Private spaceflight ==
In August 2024, she was appointed spacecraft commander of the SpaceX Crew Dragon during the private space mission Fram2, which was the first mission to a polar orbit, i.e., to fly over Earth's poles. She is the first Norwegian commercial astronaut. The mission launched on April 1, 2025 and lasted 3.5 days.

== Awards ==
2017: Imago Award for Extraordinary Technical Achievement
2026 : Peer Gynt Prize

== Bibliography ==
- Mikkelsen, Jannicke; Gangdal, Jon (2025). Astronauten. Gyldendal. ISBN 9788205616936. (in Norwegian)
