= Eric Philips (explorer) =

Australian adventurer (born 1962)

OAM Eric Philips
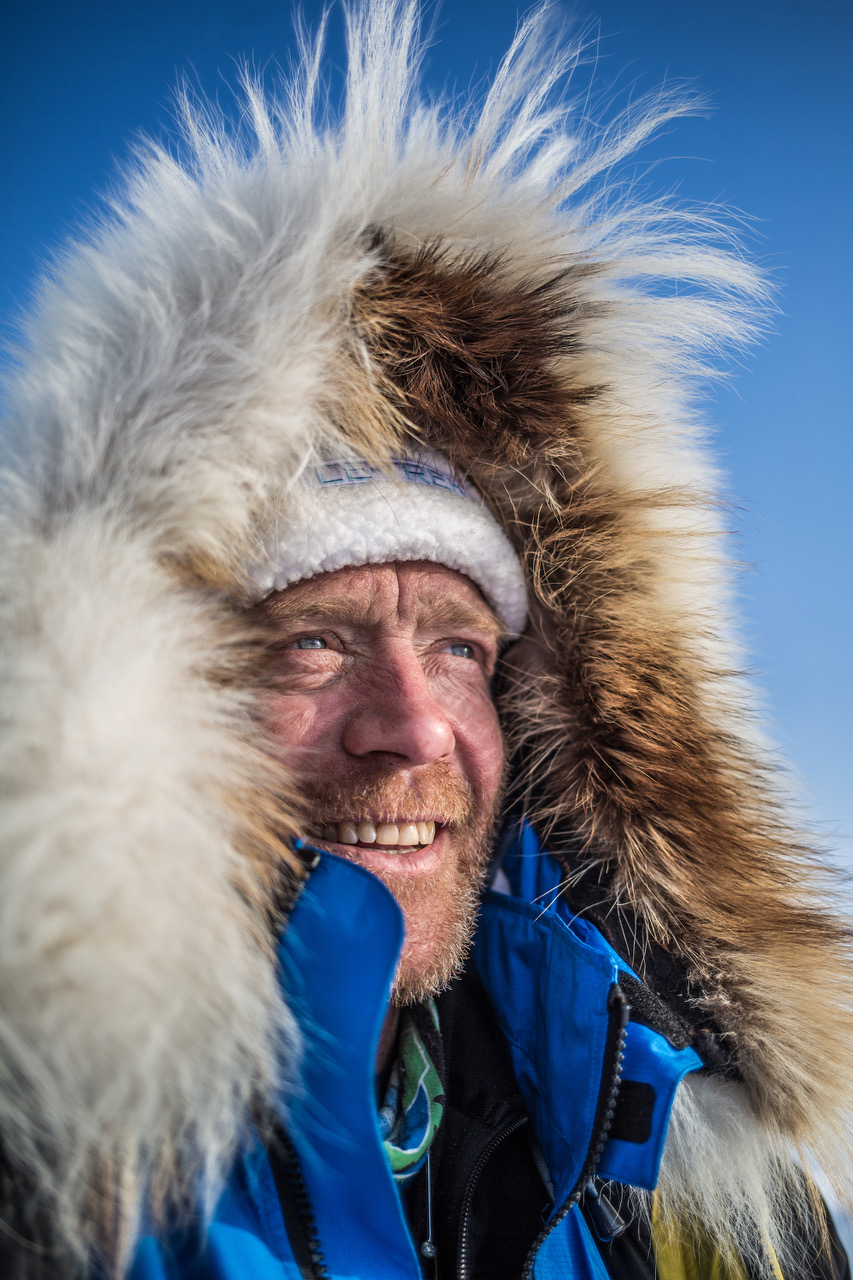
- Born: April 30, 1962 (age 64); Melbourne, Australia
- Education: University of South Australia
- Occupations: Polar explorer/guide, adventurer
- Known for: Private astronaut aboard Fram2
- Relatives
- Space career

Commercial astronaut
- Time in space: 3 days, 14 hours, 32 minutes
- Missions: Fram2
- Website: ericphilips.com

Eric Philips OAM (born 30 April 1962) is an Australian polar explorer, adventurer, polar guide and private astronaut.

== Biography ==
Philips was born in Melbourne, Australia in 1962. His parents, Keith and Josephine, emigrated to Australia from the Netherlands in 1957. Philips studied at the University of South Australia, attaining a Diploma of Teaching, a Bachelor of Education and Graduate Diploma in Outdoor Education. He was the Director of Outdoor Education at the Timbertop campus of Geelong Grammar School. Philips lives in Victoria, Australia with his wife, Susy, where he runs his own guiding and polar equipment design business, Icetrek Expeditions and Equipment. He has a daughter, Mardi, and son, Kip.

== Career ==
Philips has completed ski expeditions across icecaps on Greenland, Ellesmere Island, Iceland, Svalbard and Patagonia icecaps. He was the first Australian, together with companion Jon Muir, to ski to both the North Pole and South Pole. Philips skied to the North Pole from Siberia in 2002, producing a film, Icetrek North Pole, and has since guided numerous commercial North Pole expeditions, including the North Pole to Canada leg of Pat Farmer's Pole to Pole Run in 2011.

In 2013 Eric was a guide with UK charity Walking With The Wounded during their South Pole Allied Challenge. Together with celebrities Prince Harry, Dominic West and Alexander Skarsgard, three teams of wounded soldiers from the UK, USA, Australia and Canada skied 200 km to the South Pole. Also in 2013, Eric guided Greenpeace on a short ski expedition to the North Pole where a symbolic capsule containing 2.7 million signatures and a message to the future was lowered to the sea bed.

In 1998–99, together with Jon Muir and Peter Hillary, Philips skied from McMurdo Station in Antarctica to the South Pole via the Ross Ice Shelf and Shackleton Glacier. This 84-day, 1425 km ski expedition utilised traction kites to harness the wind. A film, Into the Teeth of the Blizzard, was produced about this expedition. Philips also guided a 925 km commercial ski expedition for Antarctic Logistics and Expeditions from the Ronne Ice Shelf to the South Pole in 2007–08 and in 2012 guided Pat Farmer on his Antarctic leg from Union Glacier camp to the South Pole. He has also skied 4 new routes and variations to the South Pole, via the Shackleton (1999), Reedy (2017), Kansas (2018) and Support Force (2023) Glaciers, completing the last at age 61

In 1995 Philips completed a ski/kite/kayak traverse of Greenland from Tasiilaq to Kangerlussuaq, resulting in the Emmy Award–winning film, Chasing the Midnight Sun. In 2000, he used similar methods to cross the South Patagonian Icecap from Chile to Argentina, producing the film, Riding the Tempest. Philips has also skied across icecaps in Iceland (2003) and Ellesmere Island (1992) and in 2008 skied from Ny-Ålesund to Longyearbyen on the island of Spitsbergen.

In 1996–97 Philips worked as a Field Training Officer at Mawson Station for the Australian Antarctic Division and again in 2008–09 as Field Leader of the International Polar Year AGAP North project. In 2006–07 he sailed with his family on board the ice-strengthened ship Sarsen to Commonwealth Bay in Antarctica and in 2009 semi-circumnavigated Greenland on board Greenpeace's icebreaker, Arctic Sunrise as part of their Climate Impacts expedition.

He has also cycle toured through Patagonia and Tierra del Fuego, around the South Island of New Zealand and from the Netherlands to Egypt.

Through his experiences Philips has developed alternative and highly effective methods of travel in the polar regions and has embraced the use of specialised plastics in the construction of polar-specific equipment. He is the inventor of the Flexi ski binding, used extensively by polar adventurers.

Philips is the author of Icetrek. The Bitter Journey to the South Pole.

== Space flight ==
In August 2024, SpaceX announced that Philips would be a crew member of the Fram2 mission on board a Crew Dragon spacecraft, which was the first human flight to a polar orbit, i.e., to fly over Earth's North and South poles. He is the first astronaut to fly to orbit as an Australian, although both Paul Scully-Power and Andy Thomas were Australian born and flew on NASA missions after being naturalised as US citizens. On 1 April 2025, the Fram2 mission launched and it lasted for 3.5 days.

== Awards and honours ==
In 2004 Eric was awarded a Medal of the Order of Australia (OAM) for achievements in polar exploration. He is the co-founder and former president of the International Polar Guides Association (IPGA) and co-creator of the Polar Expeditions Classification Scheme (PECS).
