= Popovka =

Popovka may refer to:

Inhabited localities

- Popovka, Belgorod Oblast, a village (selo) in Russia
- Popovka, Leningrad Oblast, a rural locality (khutor) in Russia
- Popovka, a village (selo) in Zainsky District of the Republic of Tatarstan
- Popovka, Kharovsky District, Vologda Oblast, a village in Russia, abolished in 2000.
- Popovka, Rossoshansky District, Voronezh Oblast, a village (selo) in Russia
- Popovka, Ternovsky District, Voronezh Oblast, a village (selo) in Russia
- Shakhty, a city in Rostov Oblast, Russia, called Popovka before 1881

Rivers and streams

- Popovka (Kolyma), a tributary of the Kolyma in far eastern Russia

Ship types

- Popovka, a nickname for a pair of Imperial Russian warships designed by Admiral Andrei Alexandrovich Popov, including Russian monitor Novgorod

== See also ==
- Popivka (disambiguation), the Ukrainian equivalent placename
- Popov
- Popovo (disambiguation)
