= 4118 Sveta =

Asteroid

Discovery
- Discovered by: L. V. Zhuravleva
- Discovery site: Crimean Astrophysical Obs.
- Discovery date: 15 October 1982

Designations
- Named after: Svetlana Savitskaya (Soviet cosmonaut)
- Alternative designations: 1982 TH_{3} · 1950 PQ; 1966 SC · 1971 QV; 1973 AO_{2} · 1984 BJ
- Minor planet category: main-belt · (outer); Eos

Orbital characteristics
- Epoch 23 March 2018 (JD 2458200.5)
- Uncertainty parameter 0
- Observation arc: 66.81 yr (24,402 d)
- Aphelion: 3.3364 AU
- Perihelion: 2.7007 AU
- Semi-major axis: 3.0186 AU
- Eccentricity: 0.1053
- Orbital period (sidereal): 5.24 yr (1,916 d)
- Mean anomaly: 260.81°
- Mean motion: 0° 11^{m} 16.44^{s} / day
- Inclination: 8.7629°
- Longitude of ascending node: 306.57°
- Argument of perihelion: 85.604°

Physical characteristics
- Mean diameter: 13.232±0.150 km
- Geometric albedo: 0.192±0.046
- Absolute magnitude (H): 11.9

4118 Sveta, or by provisional designation, 1982 TH_{3}, is an Eoan asteroid from the outer regions of the asteroid belt, approximately 13 kilometers (8.1 miles) in diameter. It was discovered on 15 October 1982, by Russian astronomer Lyudmila Zhuravleva at the Crimean Astrophysical Observatory in Nauchnij, on the Crimean peninsula. The asteroid was named after Soviet cosmonaut Svetlana Savitskaya.

== Orbit and classification ==
Sveta is a member the Eos family (606), the largest asteroid family of the outer main belt consisting of nearly 10,000 asteroids. It orbits the Sun at a distance of 2.7–3.3 AU once every 5 years and 3 months (1,916 days; semi-major axis of 3.02 AU). Its orbit has an eccentricity of 0.11 and an inclination of 9° with respect to the ecliptic.

The body's observation arc begins with its observation as 1950 PQ at Goethe Link Observatory in August 1954, more than 28 years prior to its official discovery observation at Nauchnij.

== Physical characteristics ==
No spectral type has been determined for Sveta. Members of the Eos family are typically K-type asteroids.

=== Diameter and albedo ===
According to the survey carried out by the NEOWISE mission of NASA's Wide-field Infrared Survey Explorer, Sveta measures 13.232 kilometers in diameter and its surface has an albedo of 0.192.

=== Rotation period ===
As of 2018, no rotational lightcurve of Sveta has been obtained from photometric observations. The body's rotation period, pole and shape remain unknown.

== Naming ==
This minor planet was named after Soviet cosmonaut Svetlana Savitskaya (born 1948) who, in 1982, became the second woman after Valentina Tereshkova to fly in space, and in 1984 became the first woman to walk in space. Savitskaya has also been a champion of the 1970-FAI World Aerobatic Championships, a competition in sport aviation. The official naming citation was published by the Minor Planet Center on 1 September 1993 (M.P.C. 22500). The asteroid 4303 Savitskij was named after her father Yevgeniy Savitskiy (1910–1990), a Hero of the Soviet Union and himself an aviator and fighter ace during the second World War.
