= Yevgeny Savitsky =

Soviet fighter ace and air marshal (1910–1990)

Yevgeny Yakovlevich Savitsky
- Born: 24 December [O.S. 11 December] 1910; Novorossiysk, Black Sea Governorate, Russian Empire
- Died: 6 April 1990 (aged 79); Moscow, Soviet Union
- Burial place: Novodevichy Cemetery
- Military career
- Allegiance: Soviet Union
- Branch: Soviet Air Forces; Soviet Air Defense Forces
- Service years: 1929–1990
- Rank: Marshal of Aviation
- Commands: 3rd Fighter Aviation Corps; Fighter Aviation of the National Air Defense Forces; 19th (redesignated 78th and 64th) Fighter Aviation Army; Aviation of the Soviet Air Defense Forces; Deputy Commander of the Soviet Air Defense Forces
- Conflicts: World War II
- Awards: Twice Hero of the Soviet Union; Order of Lenin (3); Complete list

Yevgeny Yakovlevich Savitsky (Russian: Евгений Яковлевич Савицкий; 24 December [O.S. 11 December] 1910 — 6 April 1990) was a Soviet World War II fighter ace who later became a marshal of aviation.

Credited with 22 individual and 2 group victories by the end of World War II, he was twice made a Hero of the Soviet Union. Savitsky commanded the Aviation of the National Air Defense Forces during the Cold War, serving as deputy commander of the National Air Defense Forces from 1966 to 1980.

== Early life and prewar career ==
Savitsky was born on 7 January 1911 in Novorossiysk, and was drafted into the Red Army in November 1929. He was sent to the Red Army Air Force 7th Military School for Pilots in Stalingrad, graduating in May 1932, after which he remained at the school as an instructor pilot and acting flight commander. From February 1934, he served as a flight commander with the 18th Light Assault Aviation Squadron of the Air Force of the Ukrainian Military District in Kiev. Savitsky's squadron flew to Krasnoyarsk in February 1935, where he became a detachment commander. He transferred to the 32nd Assault Aviation Squadron of the VVS Siberian Military District a year later, serving in the same position. Appointed commander of the 61st Separate Reconnaissance Aviation Detachment of the VVS Special Red Banner Far Eastern Army in July 1937, Savitsky became assistant commander of the 29th Fighter Aviation Regiment, part of the 26th Aviation Brigade of the VVS 2nd Separate Red Banner Army, in September 1938. Serving as the regimental commander from February 1940, he was transferred to command the 3rd Fighter Aviation Regiment as a major in September 1940 before receiving command of the 29th Fighter Aviation Division of the Far Eastern Front in April 1941.

== World War II ==
After Operation Barbarossa, the German invasion of the Soviet Union began in June 1941, Savitsky remained in the Soviet Far East for almost a year, serving as commander of the 25th Army during March and April while it provided air support to the garrisons guarding the Soviet border in Primorye. During this period, he underwent combat flight training in the new Lavochkin-Gorbunov-Gudkov LaGG-3 fighter near Moscow with the 172nd Fighter Aviation Regiment from late 1941 to early 1942 before flying the LaGG-3 with the VVS 25th Army. He was then transferred to command the 205th Fighter Aviation Division on the Voronezh Front on 5 May 1942, leading it during the Battle of Voronezh as part of the 2nd Air Army. From July to October, his division provided air cover for troops of the Voronezh Front, flying 373 combat sorties. During this time Savitsky flew the LaGG-3 and Lavochkin La-5. Between 28 and 31 October, the 2nd Air Army flew missions against Axis rail transport between Ostrogozhsk and Alexeyevka and Yevdakovo and Saguny. In November, Savitsky, now a colonel, became the commander of an aviation group of the 17th Air Army in the Southwestern Front, fighting in the Battle of Stalingrad.

This assignment proved to be brief, and on 10 December Savitsky took command of the 3rd Fighter Aviation Corps, which he led for the rest of the war, flying the Yakovlev Yak-1, Yak-9, Yak-3, and Lavochkin La-7. Until June 1943, the corps fought as part of the North Caucasian Front in the North Caucasus Strategic Offensive, before being withdrawn to the Reserve of the Supreme High Command (RVGK). After receiving replacement pilots and aircraft, the corps joined the 8th Air Army of the Southern Front (the 4th Ukrainian Front from 20 October) in late August, participating in the Donbass Strategic Offensive, the Melitopol Offensive, and the fighting for Left-bank Ukraine against German forces in the Nikopol region. During early 1944, the corps provided air cover for the reconcentration of the Russian troops to Sivash and Perekop in preparation for the Crimean Offensive, which began in April. After the capture of Sevastopol and the German evacuation of Crimea, Savitsky was a made a Hero of the Soviet Union on 11 May for his performance as commander of the 3rd Fighter Aviation Corps and for flying 107 combat sorties with fifteen victories.

The 3rd Fighter Aviation Corps was withdrawn to the RVGK in mid-May and in June were transferred to the 1st Air Army of the 3rd Belorussian Front. During the summer of 1944 it fought in Operation Bagration and the subsidiary Vitebsk–Orsha, Minsk, Vilnius and Kaunas Offensives. Transferred to the 16th Air Army of the 3rd Belorussian Front in January 1945, the corps provided air cover for the troops of the front during the Warsaw–Poznan, East Pomeranian and Berlin Offensives. Following the end of the war, Savitsky received his second Hero of the Soviet Union award on 2 June in Berlin.

Yevgeny Savitsky was credited with flying 216 sorties with 22 individual and 2 shared victories.

== Postwar ==
Postwar, Savitsky continued to command the corps until October 1947, when he was made head of the Directorate of Fighter Aviation Combat Training, part of the Main Directorate of the Soviet Air Forces. He was soon made commander of the Fighter Aviation of the National Air Defense Forces in August 1948, simultaneously serving as commander of the 19th Fighter Air Army (renumbered as the 78th in February 1949 and as the 64th later that year). Dismissed in February 1952, he returned to command of the Fighter Air Defense in May 1953. Savitsky studied at the aviation faculty of the Voroshilov Higher Military Academy between January 1954 and November 1955, after which he resumed his command. In July 1960, due to Air Defense Force reorganization, he became commander of the Aviation of the PVO, being promoted to Marshal of Aviation on 6 May 1961. Appointed deputy commander of the PVO in July 1966, Savitsky held that position until April 1980, when he became an inspector of the Group of Inspectors General of the Ministry of Defense, traditionally a retirement post for elderly generals. He died in Moscow on 6 April 1990.

== Aerial victory claims ==
In his final Hero of the Soviet Union citation, Savitsky was credited with 22 individual and two shared victories for a total of 24. Research conducted by Russian aviation historian Mikhail Bykov in the Central Archives of the Russian Ministry of Defence found incomplete operational documentation for the crediting of Savitsky with a total of nineteen victories – eighteen individual and one shared. Details of these claims are listed below:

Chronology of aerial victories
No. of claim	Date	Credit	Foe	Place
1	28 June 1942	1	Messerschmitt Bf 109	Gatishche-Yurskoye
2	27 July 1942	1 shared (1/3)	Bf 109	north of Voronezh
3	15 September 1942	1	Focke-Wulf Fw 190	southeast of Kon-Kolodez
4	20 April 1943	1	Junkers Ju 87	Krymskaya
5	5 May 1943	1	Bf 109	north of Krymskaya
6	29 September 1943	1	Junkers Ju 88	west of Vishnyevsky
7	27 October 1943	1	Ju 88	southeast of Novo-Rubinovka
8	3 January 1944	1	Bf 109	Trudolyubovka
9	13 March 1944	1	Heinkel He 111 (night mission)	Rayzendorf aerodome
10	9 April 1944	1	Bf 109	southwest of Tarkhan
11	1 July 1944	1	Fieseler Fi 156	east of Minsk
12	17 January 1945	1	Bf 109	southwest of Sochaczew
13	19 January 1945	1	Fw 190	northwest of Pilaszków
14	3 March 1945	1	Fw 190	north of Pyritz
15	6 March 1945	1	Ju 87	east of Altdamm
16	11 March 1945	1	Fw 190	northeast of Greifenhagen
17	17 April 1945	1	Fw 190	Berlin
18	23 April 1945	1	Fw 190	Basdorf

== Personal life ==
His daughter, Svetlana Savitskaya became a Soviet cosmonaut who flew aboard the Soyuz T-7 in 1982, becoming the second woman in space some 19 years after Valentina Tereshkova, and, in 1984, the first woman to fly to space twice and to perform a spacewalk.

== Honors and awards ==
- Twice Hero of the Soviet Union (11 May 1944 and 2 June 1945)
- Lenin Prize (21 April 1978)
- Honored Military Pilot of the USSR (19 August 1965)
- Three Orders of Lenin (11 May 1944, 5 November 1954, and 31 October 1967)
- Order of the October Revolution (23 December 1980)
- Five Order of the Red Banner (16 March 1942, 23 November 1942, 31 July 1948, 11 November 1950, and 23 December 1970)
- Order of Suvorov 2nd class (19 March 1944)
- Order of Kutuzov 2nd class (22 July 1944)
- Order of the Patriotic War 1st class (11 March 1985)
- Two Order of the Red Star (3 November 1944 and 29 April 1957)
- Order for Service to the Homeland in the Armed Forces of the USSR (2nd class - 30 April 1975; 3rd class - 20 February 1990)

He was declared an honorary citizen of Novorossiysk, Sevastopol, and Vilnius. The asteroid 4303 Savitskij is named for him.

== Bibliography ==
- Bykov, Mikhail (2014). Все асы Сталина 1936–1953 гг [All aces of Stalin 1936-1953] (in Russian). Moscow: Yauza. ISBN 9785457567221.
- Goremykin, V.P., ed. (2014). Великая Отечественная: Комдивы. Военный биографический словарь [The Great Patriotic War: Division Commanders. Military Biographical Dictionary] (in Russian). Vol. 2. Moscow: Kuchkovo Pole. ISBN 9785995003410.
- Mellinger, George (2005). Yakovlev Aces of World War 2. Osprey Publishing.
- Simonov, Andrey; Bodrikhin, Nikolai (2017). Боевые лётчики — дважды и трижды Герои Советского Союза [Combat pilots - twice and three times Heroes of the Soviet Union]. Moscow: Russian Knights Foundation and Vadim Zadorozhny Museum of Technology. ISBN 9785990960510. OCLC 1005741956.
