= Popowo =

Popowo may refer to the following places:

- Popowo, Gmina Lipno in Kuyavian-Pomeranian Voivodeship (north-central Poland)
- Popowo, Gmina Tłuchowo in Kuyavian-Pomeranian Voivodeship (north-central Poland)
- Popowo, Wałcz County in West Pomeranian Voivodeship (north-west Poland)
- Popowo, Augustów County in Podlaskie Voivodeship (north-east Poland)
- Popowo, Grajewo County in Podlaskie Voivodeship (north-east Poland)
- Popowo, Międzychód County in Greater Poland Voivodeship (west-central Poland)
- Popowo, Oborniki County in Greater Poland Voivodeship (west-central Poland)
- Popowo, Szamotuły County in Greater Poland Voivodeship (west-central Poland)
- Popowo, Międzyrzecz County in Lubusz Voivodeship (west Poland)
- Popowo, Nowa Sól County in Lubusz Voivodeship (west Poland)
- Popowo, Lębork County in Pomeranian Voivodeship (north Poland)
- Popowo, Gmina Stegna, Nowy Dwór County in Pomeranian Voivodeship (north Poland)
- Popowo, Warmian-Masurian Voivodeship (north Poland)
- Popowo, Koszalin County in West Pomeranian Voivodeship (north-west Poland)

== See also ==
- Popovo (disambiguation)
- Popów (disambiguation)
