= Niedźwiada =

Niedźwiada may refer to the following places in Poland:

- Niedźwiada, Łódź Voivodeship (central Poland)
- Niedźwiada, Lubartów County in Lublin Voivodeship (east Poland)
- Niedźwiada, Subcarpathian Voivodeship (south-east Poland)
- Niedźwiada, Warmian-Masurian Voivodeship (north Poland)
