= Dyzma Gałaj =

Polish politician and sociologist

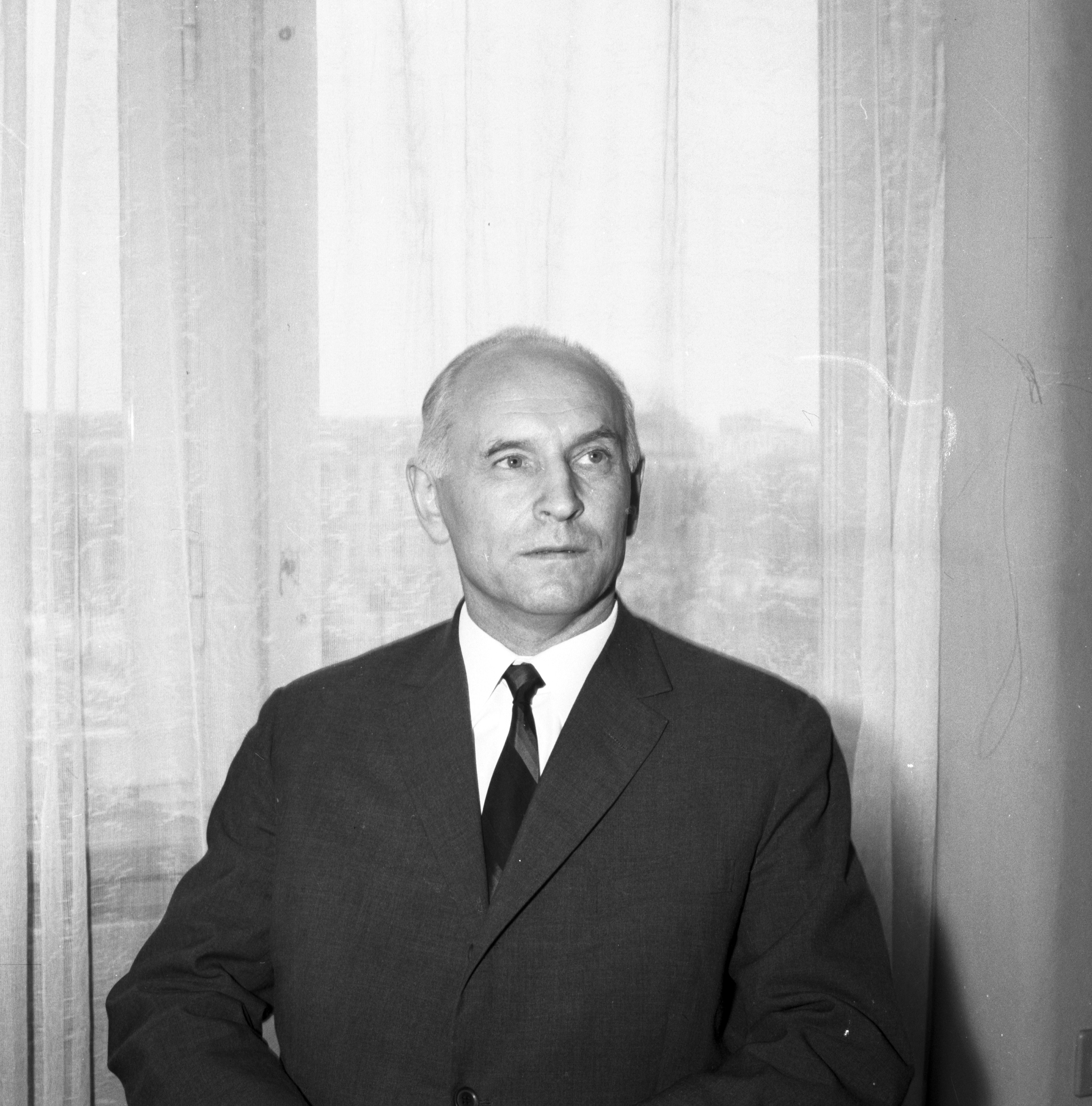
- Portrait of Gałaj by Grażyna Rutowska, 1969
- Born: Dyzma Kazimierz Gałaj; 15 January 1915; Mystkowice, Warsaw Governorate, Congress Poland
- Died: 6 December 2000 (aged 85); Warsaw, Masovian Voivodeship, Third Polish Republic
- Resting place: Powązki Military Cemetery
- Political party: ZSL
- Movement: Endokomuna

Academic background
- Education: University of Łódź
- Alma mater: SGGW
- Thesis: (1959)

Academic work
- Discipline: History
- Main interests: History of the Polish peasantry
- Resistance
- Allegiance: IAB
- Branch: People's Party
- Service years: 1940-1945
- Unit: BCh
- Conflict: World War II

Dyzma Kazimierz Gałaj (1915, Mystkowice - 2000, Warsaw) was a Polish sociologist and politician.

During World War II, he was a member of the Polish peasant Bataliony Chłopskie resistance. After the war he would become a communist political activist, and study at the University of Łódź. He would be a member of the Polish parliament (Sejm) from 1965 to 1985, and marshal of the Sejm in 1971–1972, representing the United People's Party (ZSL). From 1972 to 1976, he was a member of the Polish Council of State. In politics, he was seen as a supporter of general Mieczysław Moczar.

As a scholar, his work concentrated on the 20th century Polish peasantry.
