= Placencja =

- Village
- Location within Poland
- Coordinates: 52°4′N 19°59′E
- Country: Poland
- Voivodeship: Łódź
- County: Łowicz
- Gmina: Łowicz
- Population: 190

Placencja [plaˈt͡sɛnt͡sja] is a village in the administrative district of Gmina Łowicz, within Łowicz County, Łódź Voivodeship, in central Poland.
