= Svetlana Savitskaya =

Soviet cosmonaut (born 1948)

Svetlana Savitskaya MP
- Светлана Савицкая
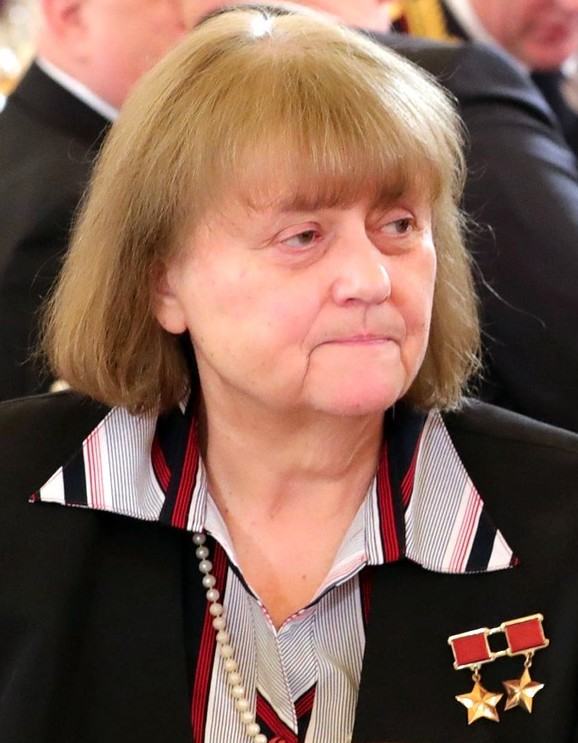
- Savitskaya in 2018

Member of the State Duma (Party List Seat)
- Incumbent
- Assumed office 29 December 2003

Member of the State Duma for Moscow Oblast
- In office 17 January 1996 – 29 December 2003
- Preceded by: constituency established
- Succeeded by: Dmitry Sablin
- Constituency: Sergiyev Posad (No. 113)

Personal details
- Born: 8 August 1948 (age 78) Moscow, RSFSR, USSR
- Party: CPRF (from 1993); CPSU (until 1991)
- Spouse: Viktor Khatkovsky
- Children: 1
- Parents: Yevgeny Savitsky (father); Lydia Savitskaya (mother)
- Education: Central United Flight Technical School; Moscow Aviation Institute; Flight Research Institute of the Ministry of Aviation Industry; Moscow Higher Technical School (DPhil)
- Occupation: flight engineer; aviator; flight instructor; politician
- Awards: Hero of the Soviet Union (2)
- Space career

Cosmonaut (retired)
- Rank: Major
- Time in space: 19 days 17 hours 6 minutes
- Selection: 1980 (Female Group 2)
- Total EVAs: 1
- Total EVA time: 3 hours 35 minutes
- Missions: Soyuz T-7/Soyuz T-5 (Salyut 7 - EP2); Soyuz T-12 (Salyut 7 - EP4)
- Svetlana Savitskaya's voice Echo of Moscow, recorded 18 January 2007

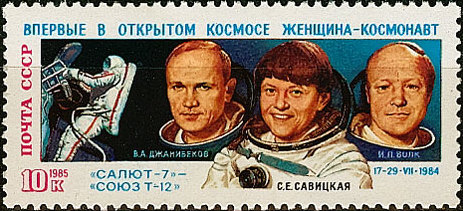
Savitskaya on Soyuz T-12, and her spacewalk

Svetlana Yevgenyevna Savitskaya (Russian: Светла́на Евге́ньевна Сави́цкая; born 8 August 1948) is a Russian former aviator and Soviet cosmonaut who flew aboard Soyuz T-7 in 1982, becoming the second woman in space. On her 1984 Soyuz T-12 mission she became the first woman to fly to space twice, and the first woman to perform a spacewalk.

She set several FAI world records as a pilot.

== Early life and early career ==
Svetlana Savitskaya was born in a privileged family. Her father, Yevgeny Savitsky, was a highly decorated fighter pilot during the Second World War, which later brought him to the position of Deputy Commander-in-Chief of Soviet Air Defense. Her mother was a Muscovite Communist party leader.

Without the knowledge of her parents, Savitskaya began parachuting at the age of 16. Her father realized her secret extracurricular activity upon the discovery of a parachute knife in his daughter's school bag. After his discovery, he further promoted this tendency. On her seventeenth birthday she already had 450 parachute jumps. Over the next year, she led record stratosphere jumps from 13,800 m and 14,250 m. Over the course of her flying experience, Savitskaya achieved three world record jumps from the stratosphere and 15 world record jumps from jet planes.

After graduating in 1966, she enrolled in the Moscow Aviation Institute (MAI), where she also took flight lessons. In 1971 she was licensed as a flight instructor. After graduating from the MAI in 1972, she trained as a test pilot at the Fedotov Test Pilot School, graduating in 1976. In May 1978 she went to work for the aircraft manufacturer Yakovlev, as a test pilot. In her flight experience, she became the first woman to reach 2,683 km/h in a MiG-25 aircraft. An experienced and highly educated woman in the Soviet Space Program, Savitskaya was reportedly an extremely serious, unbending, and steely woman.

Between 1969 and 1977 she was a member of the Soviet national team for aerobatics. At the FAI World Aerobatic Championships in July 1970 at Hullavington, she flew a Yak-18 and won the world championship together with an all-female team. At this particular Championship in the United Kingdom, a journalist for the British Press nicknamed Savitskaya "Miss Sensation". At the 1972 World Championships in Salon-de-Provence she placed third; in 1976 in Kiev with a Yak-50, fifth.

== Soviet space programme ==
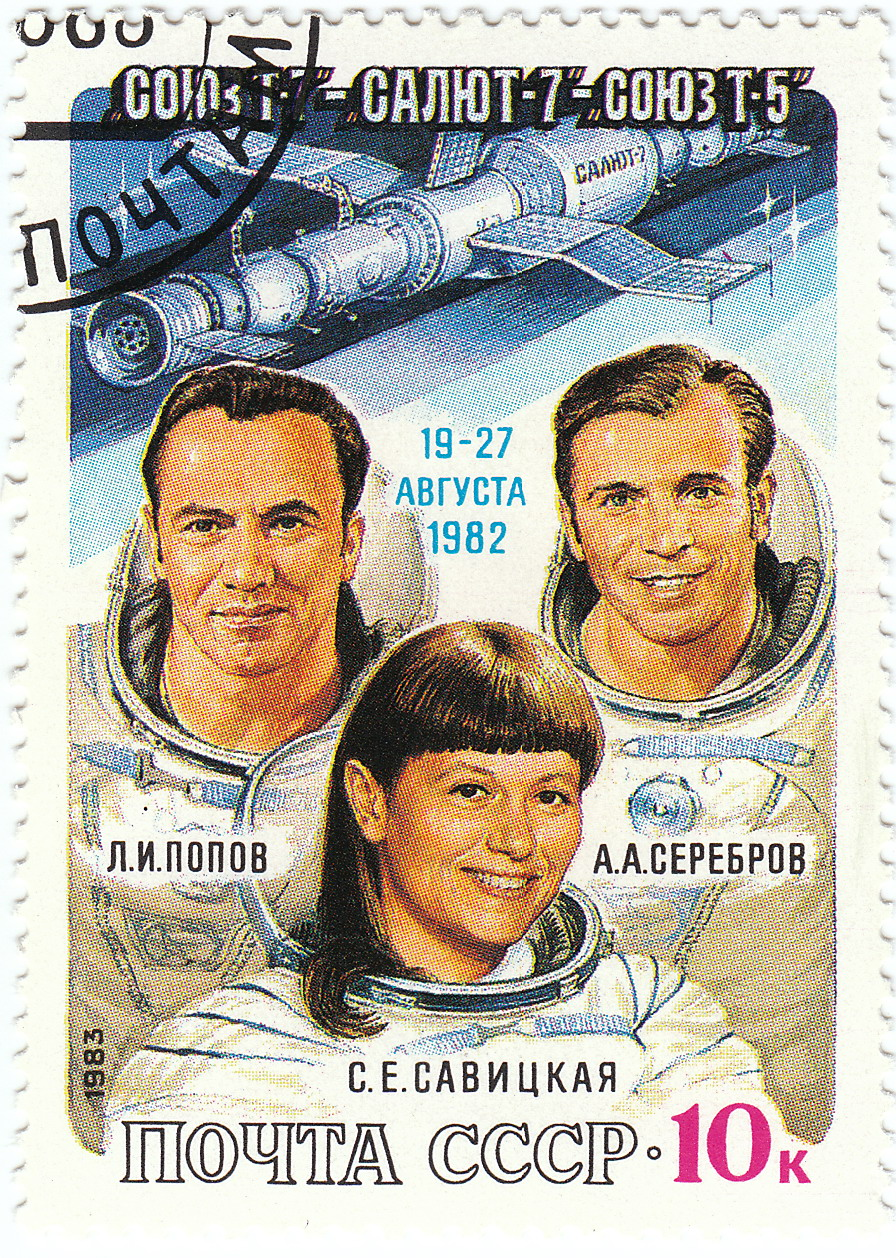
Savitskaya on a 1983 postage stamp

In 1979, Savitskaya participated in the selection process for the second group of female cosmonauts. On 30 June 1980, she was officially admitted to the cosmonaut group. Of the nine women selected, Savitskaya was the only test pilot. The group's training was announced during French Air Force officer and astronaut Jean-Loup Chretien's space mission. She passed her exams on 24 February 1982.

=== First flight: Soyuz T-7 / T-5 ===
In December 1981, Savitskaya prepared for her first space flight, a short-term flight to the space station Salyut 7. She held the position of research cosmonaut on this mission. The mission of this second visiting expedition of the Salyut 7 was to prove the Soviet superiority to America by flying another woman into space and to replace the Soyuz T-5 spacecraft, which the crew would use for their return, with a new vehicle.

The commander of this mission was Leonid Popov, with his third flight; it was flight engineer Alexander Serebrov's first flight.

The launch of Soyuz T-7 took place on 19 August 1982. This made Savitskaya the second woman in space, 19 years after Valentina Tereshkova. During the journey, Savitskaya claimed to have tied herself down to prevent from being carried into another compartment of the craft due to the loss of gravity. The three cosmonauts docked with the space station the following day, where they were welcomed by Anatoly Berezovoy and Valentin Lebedev. This was the first time a space station had a mixed-gender crew. Savitskaya was assigned the orbital module of Soyuz T-7 as a private area, but slept as well as the men in the space station. On 27 August 1982, Popov, Savitskaya, and Serebrov returned to Earth in Soyuz T-5. The total duration of the mission was 7 days, 21 hours, and 52 minutes.

=== Second flight: Soyuz T-12 ===
In December 1983 she was assigned to her second flight, including an extravehicular activity, or EVA, three weeks after American astronaut Kathy Sullivan's flight and EVA assignment were made public. Savitskaya was chosen above other female cosmonauts due to her extensive flight experience and physical ability to perform the necessary operations in a heavy, bulky space suit for multiple hours. Savitskaya participated in this mission under the title of flight engineer.

Again, it was to be a short-term mission to Salyut 7, this time bringing tools to the station so that the third resident crew, the Salyut 7 EO-3, could repair a fuel line.

On 17 July 1984, Savitskaya launched aboard Soyuz T-12, together with Commander Vladimir Dzhanibekov and research cosmonaut Igor Volk. On 25 July 1984, Savitskaya became the first woman to spacewalk, conducting EVA outside the Salyut 7 space station for 3 hours and 35 minutes, during which she cut and welded metals in space along with her colleague Vladimir Dzhanibekov. The importance of their mission was to test the Universal Hand Tool or Universalny Rabochy Instrument (URI). This tool created at the Paton Institute in Kiev, Ukraine could be used to cut, solder, weld, and braze in space. During the EVA, Savitskaya performed a total of 6 cuts of titanium and stainless steel, 2 coatings of anodized aluminum, 6 tests of tin and lead solder, and test cuts of a 0.5 mm titanium sample. Of the 57 Soviet/Russian spacewalkers through 2010, she is the only woman, and as of April 2020 is still the only Soviet/Russian woman to walk in space. The return to Earth took place on 29 July 1984.

Savitskaya's and Dzhanibekov's training and tests allowed for Dzhanibekov to direct two members of the Salyut 7 crew, Kizim and Solovyov, who had performed multiple EVA's to repair the ship, in the techniques to operate the URI in order to fully repair the fuel line. The total duration of their mission lasted 11 days, 19 hours, and 14 minutes.

=== Possible third spaceflight ===
Upon returning to Earth, Savitskaya was assigned as the commander of an all-female Soyuz crew to Salyut 7 in commemoration of International Women's Day. She was chosen for this duty because she was the only experienced female cosmonaut still on active duty at the time. She was set to command Yekaterina Ivanova and Yelena Dobrokvashina, two younger female cosmonauts. In February 1985, however, the radio contact with Salyut 7 was lost; the space station was rescued by the Soyuz T-13 mission in the summer of 1985. When the next mission had to be stopped in November 1985, due to an illness of the commander Vladimir Vasyutin, the women's flight was finally canceled. In addition, after two unsuccessful flights in 1983, Soyuz T-8 and Soyuz T-10-1, not enough Soyuz spacecraft were available. Later it would have been possible to fly with a Soyuz-TM to the space station Mir. However, this plan was not pursued due to Savitskaya's pregnancy and birth of her son in 1986.

== Biography ==
Savitskaya is married and has one child, a son Konstantin born on 7 November 1986. In February 1986, she graduated from the Bauman Moscow Higher Technical School. From 1983 to 1994 Savitskaya held a position of Deputy Head of NPO Energia.

A committed communist, Savitskaya was elected as a people's deputy of the USSR from 1989 and a people's deputy of Russia in 1990, a position she held until 1992. She did not welcome the collapse of the Soviet Union, noting that her parents would live a "second death" were they to see Russia as it was.

Savitskaya retired in 1993 from the Russian Air Force with the rank of Major. In 1994/95 she worked as an assistant professor in Economics and Investment at the Moscow State Aviation Institute. In 1996, she was elected a deputy of the State Duma representing the Communist Party of the Russian Federation, and has been re-elected four times since then. She presently serves as Deputy Chair of the Committee on Defence, and is also a member of the Coordination council presidium of the National Patriotic Union.

== FAI World Records ==
Date	Class	Discipline	Plane	Result
6 June 1974	turbojet	Climb to 6000 m	MiG-21	1:20.4 min
6 June 1974	turbojet	Climb to 9000 m	MiG-21	1:46.7 min
7 June 1974	turbojet	Climb to 3000 m	MiG-21	0:59.1 min
7 June 1974	turbojet	Climb to 12000 m	MiG-21	2:35.1 min
15 November 1974	rocket plane	Climb to 3000 m	MiG-21	0:41.2 min
15 November 1974	rocket plane	Climb to 9000 m	MiG-21	1:21 min
15 November 1974	rocket plane	Climb to 12000 m	MiG-21	1:59.3 min
2 June 1975	turbojet	Speed over 15/25 km	MiG-25	2683.45 km/h
31 August 1977	turbojet	Altitude in horizontal flight	MiG-25	21,209.9 m
21 October 1977	turbojet	Speed over circuit of 500 km	MiG-25	2466.31 km/h
12 April 1978	turbojet	Speed over circuit of 1000 km	MiG-25	2333 km/h
17 January 1979	internal combustion plane	Climb to 3000 m	Yak-50	4:21.4 min
23 April 1981	turbojet, take-off weight 16–20 tons	Payload at 2000 m altitude	Yak-40K	5012 kg
24 April 1981	turbojet, take-off weight 12–16 tons	Payload at 2000 m altitude	Yak-40K	4084 kg

== Honours and awards ==
- Hero of the Soviet Union, twice (1982, 1984)
- Orders of Lenin, twice (1982, 1984)
- Order of the Badge of Honour (1976)
- Medal "For Merit in Space Exploration" (12 April 2011) – for great achievements in the field of research, development and utilization of outer space, many years of honest work, public activities
- Pilot-Cosmonaut of the USSR
- Honoured Master of Sports
- Gold Medal and 18 degrees FAI
- 16 gold medals, sports of the USSR
- Special medal for the women's world record stay in space
- Honorary Citizen of Baikonur (1982)

Savitskaya was one of five cosmonauts selected to raise the Russian flag at the Sochi 2014 Winter Olympics opening ceremony.

The asteroid 4118 Sveta is named after her.

== See also ==
- List of female spacefarers
- List of female Heroes of the Soviet Union
