= Adam of Łowicz =

Renaissance-era professor of medicine at the University of Krakow

Adam of Łowicz (also "Adam of Bocheń" and "Adamus Polonus"; born in Bocheń, near Łowicz, Poland; died 7 February 1514, in Kraków, Poland) was a professor of medicine at the University of Krakow, its rector in 1510–1511, a humanist, writer and philosopher.

== Life ==
Adam studied in the Department of Liberal Arts at the University of Krakow, earning a baccalaureate in 1488 and a master's degree in 1492. He then studied medicine in Italy. Returning to Poland, he served as court physician to Kings Jan I Olbracht, Alexander Jagiellon and Zygmunt I. In 1510 and 1511 he was twice elected rector of the University of Krakow. He opposed the clergy's dominance over the secular estate. An unconventional thinker, he hypothesized the immortality of humankind.

In the early sixteenth century, Plato had become a model for philosophy in Italy, especially in Medicean Florence. In some ways he was represented in Poland by Adam of Łowicz, author of Conversations about Immortality.

== Works ==
- Fundamentum scienciae nobilissimae secretorum naturae (1489; alchemy).
- Dialogus... de quattuor statuum... immortalitatem contentione (Conversations... about Immortality, ca. 1507).

== Memorial ==
In 1964, a memorial plaque in his honor was unveiled in Bocheń.

== See also ==
- Physician writer
- List of Poles
- History of philosophy in Poland
