= Ostrów, Łowicz County =

Ostrów
- Village
- Location within Poland
- Coordinates: 52°6′16″N 19°50′51″E
- Country: Poland
- Voivodeship: Łódź
- County: Łowicz
- Gmina: Łowicz
- Population: 170

Ostrów [ˈɔstruf] is a village in the administrative district of Gmina Łowicz, within Łowicz County, Łódź Voivodeship, in central Poland.
