= Szczudłów =

- Village
- Location within Poland
- Coordinates: 52°7′7″N 19°52′39″E
- Country: Poland
- Voivodeship: Łódź
- County: Łowicz
- Gmina: Łowicz

Szczudłów [ˈʂt͡ʂudwuf] is a village in the administrative district of Gmina Łowicz, within Łowicz County, Łódź Voivodeship, in central Poland.
