= Zielkowice =

- Village
- Location within Poland
- Coordinates: 52°5′N 19°59′E
- Country: Poland
- Voivodeship: Łódź
- County: Łowicz
- Gmina: Łowicz
- Population: 900

Zielkowice [ʑɛlkɔˈvit͡sɛ] is a village in the administrative district of Gmina Łowicz, within Łowicz County, Łódź Voivodeship, in central Poland.
