= Świeryż Pierwszy =

- Village
- Location within Poland
- Coordinates: 52°9′19″N 19°51′58″E
- Country: Poland
- Voivodeship: Łódź
- County: Łowicz
- Gmina: Łowicz

Świeryż Pierwszy (Polish pronunciation: [ˈɕfjɛrɨʂ ˈpjɛrfʂɨ]) is a village in the administrative district of Gmina Łowicz, within Łowicz County, Łódź Voivodeship, in central Poland.
