= Klewków =

- Village
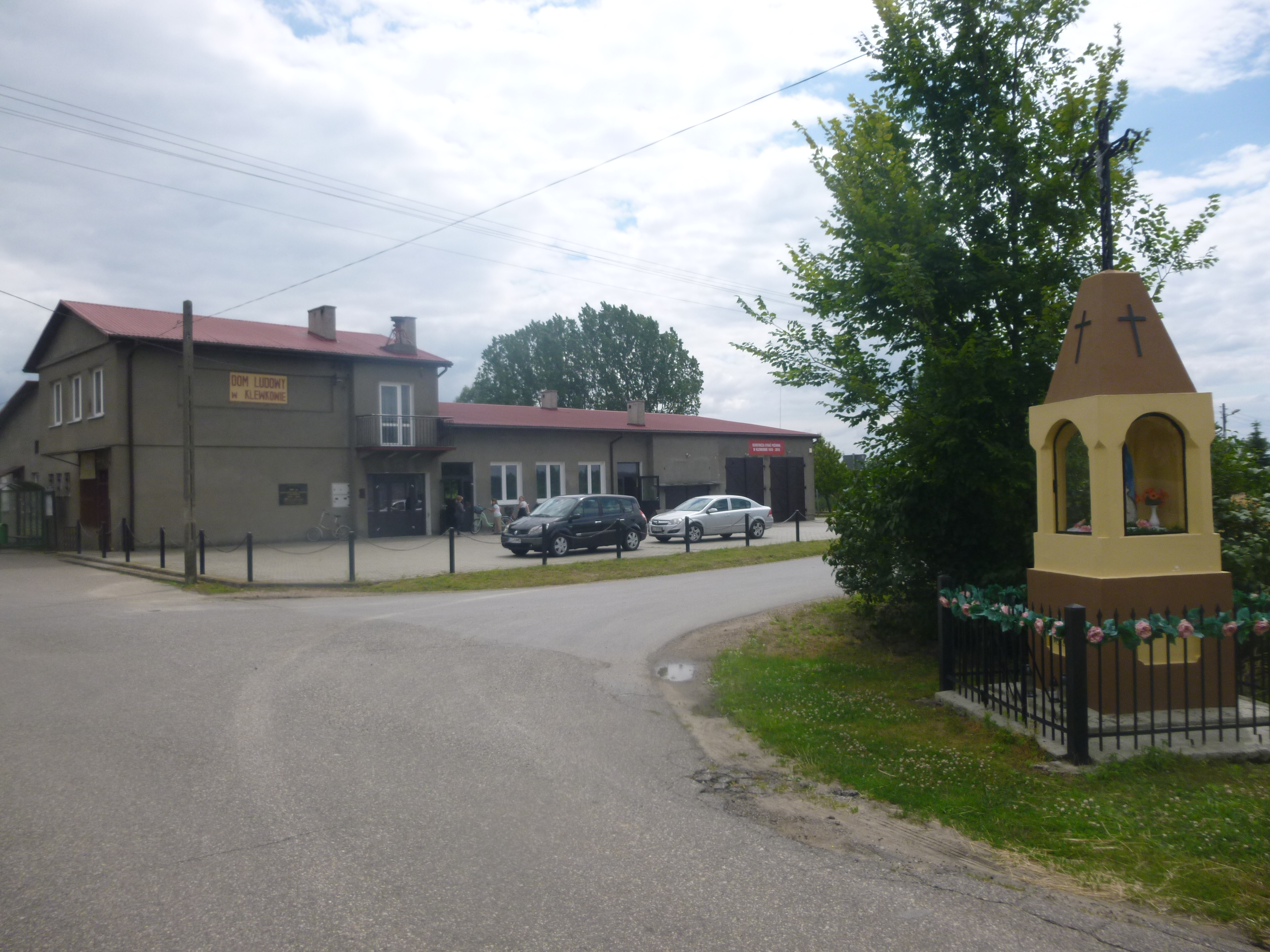
- Crossroads in Klewków

- Location within Poland
- Coordinates: 52°8′8″N 19°54′41″E
- Country: Poland
- Voivodeship: Łódź
- County: Łowicz
- Gmina: Łowicz

Klewków [ˈklɛfkuf] is a village in the administrative district of Gmina Łowicz, within Łowicz County, Łódź Voivodeship, in central Poland.
