= Małszyce, Łódź Voivodeship =

Małszyce
- Village
- Location within Poland
- Coordinates: 52°7′58″N 19°55′16″E
- Country: Poland
- Voivodeship: Łódź
- County: Łowicz
- Gmina: Łowicz
- Population: 269

Małszyce [mau̯ˈʂɨt͡sɛ] is a village in the administrative district of Gmina Łowicz, within Łowicz County, Łódź Voivodeship, in central Poland.
