= Zabostów Mały =

- Village
- Location within Poland
- Coordinates: 52°7′N 20°0′E
- Country: Poland
- Voivodeship: Łódź
- County: Łowicz
- Gmina: Łowicz
- Population (approx.): 240

Zabostów Mały [zaˈbɔstuf ˈmawɨ] is a village in the administrative district of Gmina Łowicz, within Łowicz County, Łódź Voivodeship, in central Poland.
