= Popovo =

Popovo may refer to:

- Popovo, Bulgaria, a town in Bulgaria
- Popovo, Leningrad Oblast, a rural locality (a station settlement) in Leningrad Oblast, Russia
- Popovo, Moscow Oblast, a rural locality (a village) in Moscow Oblast, Russia
- Popovo, Novgorod Oblast, a rural locality (a village) in Novgorod Oblast, Russia
- Popovo, Tver Oblast, a rural locality (a village) in Tver Oblast, Russia
- Popovo (župa), medieval county in what is now Bosnia and Herzegovina
- Popovo Polje, a karstic field in Bosnia and Herzegovina

== See also ==
- Popovo Selo
- Popov
- Popovka (disambiguation)
- Popowo (disambiguation)
