= Bolshoye Maslennikovo =

Bolshoye Maslennikovo Большое Масленниково
- Village
- Location within Yaroslavl Oblast Location within European Russia Location within Russia
- Coordinates: 57°42′16″N 39°28′9″E
- Country: Russia
- Oblast: Yaroslavl
- District: Tutayevsky
- Municipality: Chebakovskoye rural settlement

Population (2010)
  - Total: 9
- Time zone: UTC+3:00
- Postal code: 152336

Bolshoye Maslennikovo (Russian: Большое Масленниково, [bɐlʲˈʂojə mɐs⁽ʲ⁾ˈlʲɵnkɐˈvə]) is a village in Yaroslavl Oblast, Russia, located in the municipality of the Chebakovskoye rural settlement in Tutayevsky District. It lies about 20 km (12.43 mi) to the west from Yaroslavl. In 2010, the village was inhabited by 9 people. The settlement is best known as the birthplace of Valentina Tereshkova, the first woman to fly to outer space during the Vostok 6 mission in 1963.

== Notable people ==
Valentina Tereshkova, the first woman to fly to outer space during the Vostok 6 mission on 16 June 1963, was born in the village. The museum, Cosmos, devoted to Tereshkova and her flight, is in the village of Nikulskoye, about 5 km (3.1 mi) south of Bolshoye Maslennikovo.

== Demographics ==
Historical population
Year	2007	2010
Pop.	1	9
±%	—	+800.0%
