= Jastrzębia, Łowicz County =

Jastrzębia
- Village
- Location within Poland
- Coordinates: 52°5′57″N 19°54′24″E
- Country: Poland
- Voivodeship: Łódź
- County: Łowicz
- Gmina: Łowicz
- Population: 301

Jastrzębia [jasˈtʂɛmbja] is a village in the administrative district of Gmina Łowicz, within Łowicz County, Łódź Voivodeship, in central Poland.
