= Jamno, Łowicz County =

Jamno
- Village
- Location within Poland
- Coordinates: 52°3′18″N 19°53′45″E
- Country: Poland
- Voivodeship: Łódź
- County: Łowicz
- Gmina: Łowicz
- Population: 175

Jamno [ˈjamnɔ] is a village in the administrative district of Gmina Łowicz, within Łowicz County, Łódź Voivodeship, in central Poland.
