= Dąbkowice Górne =

- Village
- Location within Poland
- Coordinates: 52°4′42″N 19°51′21″E
- Country: Poland
- Voivodeship: Łódź
- County: Łowicz
- Gmina: Łowicz
- Population: 233

Dąbkowice Górne [dɔmpkɔˈvit͡sɛ ˈɡurnɛ] is a village in the administrative district of Gmina Łowicz, within Łowicz County, Łódź Voivodeship, in central Poland.
