= Bocheń =

- Village
- Location within Poland
- Coordinates: 52°6′17″N 19°48′50″E
- Country: Poland
- Voivodeship: Łódź
- County: Łowicz
- Gmina: Łowicz

Population
  - Total: 321
- Time zone: UTC+1 (CET)
  - Summer (DST): UTC+2 (CEST)
- Vehicle registration: ELC

Bocheń [ˈbɔxɛɲ] is a village in the administrative district of Gmina Łowicz, within Łowicz County, Łódź Voivodeship, in central Poland.

== History ==
Bocheń dates back to prehistoric or early medieval times. The village was mentioned in a medieval document from 1359.

During the invasion of Poland, which started World War II, on September 16, 1939, the Germans murdered 15 Polish farmers in Bocheń. 12 Polish farmers from Bocheń and nearby Guźnia were also murdered that day by Wehrmacht troops near the Rydwan lake, south of Bocheń and Guźnia (see also Nazi crimes against the Polish nation). During the German occupation of Poland the village was an important center of Polish resistance, and even underground Polish press was issued there.

== Notable people ==
- Adam of Łowicz (died in 1514), Polish Renaissance humanist, writer and philosopher, professor of medicine at the University of Kraków, and rector of the university in 1510–1511
