= Świeryż Drugi =

- Village
- Location within Poland
- Coordinates: 52°9′46″N 19°52′29″E
- Country: Poland
- Voivodeship: Łódź
- County: Łowicz
- Gmina: Łowicz

Świeryż Drugi (Polish pronunciation: [ˈɕfjɛrɨʐ ˈdruɡʲi]) is a village in the administrative district of Gmina Łowicz, within Łowicz County, Łódź Voivodeship, in central Poland.
