= Popów =

Popów may refer to the following places:

- Popów, Łowicz County in Łódź Voivodeship (central Poland)
- Popów, Poddębice County in Łódź Voivodeship (central Poland)
- Popów, Lublin Voivodeship (east Poland)
- Popów, Greater Poland Voivodeship (west-central Poland)
- Popów, Silesian Voivodeship (south Poland)
