= Parma, Łódź Voivodeship =

Parma
- Village
- Location within Poland
- Coordinates: 52°3′23″N 19°59′51″E
- Country: Poland
- Voivodeship: Łódź
- County: Łowicz
- Gmina: Łowicz
- Named for: Parma
- Time zone: UTC+1 (CET)
  - Summer (DST): UTC+2 (CEST)
- Vehicle registration: ELC

Parma [ˈparma] is a village in the administrative district of Gmina Łowicz, within Łowicz County, Łódź Voivodeship, in central Poland.

== History ==
The village is named after the Italian city of Parma. It was owned by Polish noblewoman Helena Radziwiłłowa, who probably founded the village.

According to the 1921 census, the village had a population of 373, entirely Polish by nationality and Roman Catholic by confession.

During the invasion of Poland, which started World War II, on 12 September 1939, Germans murdered 32 Polish farmers in Parma, including 11 inhabitants of the village (see also Nazi crimes against the Polish nation). There is a memorial dedicated to the victims in the village.
