= Guźnia =

- Village
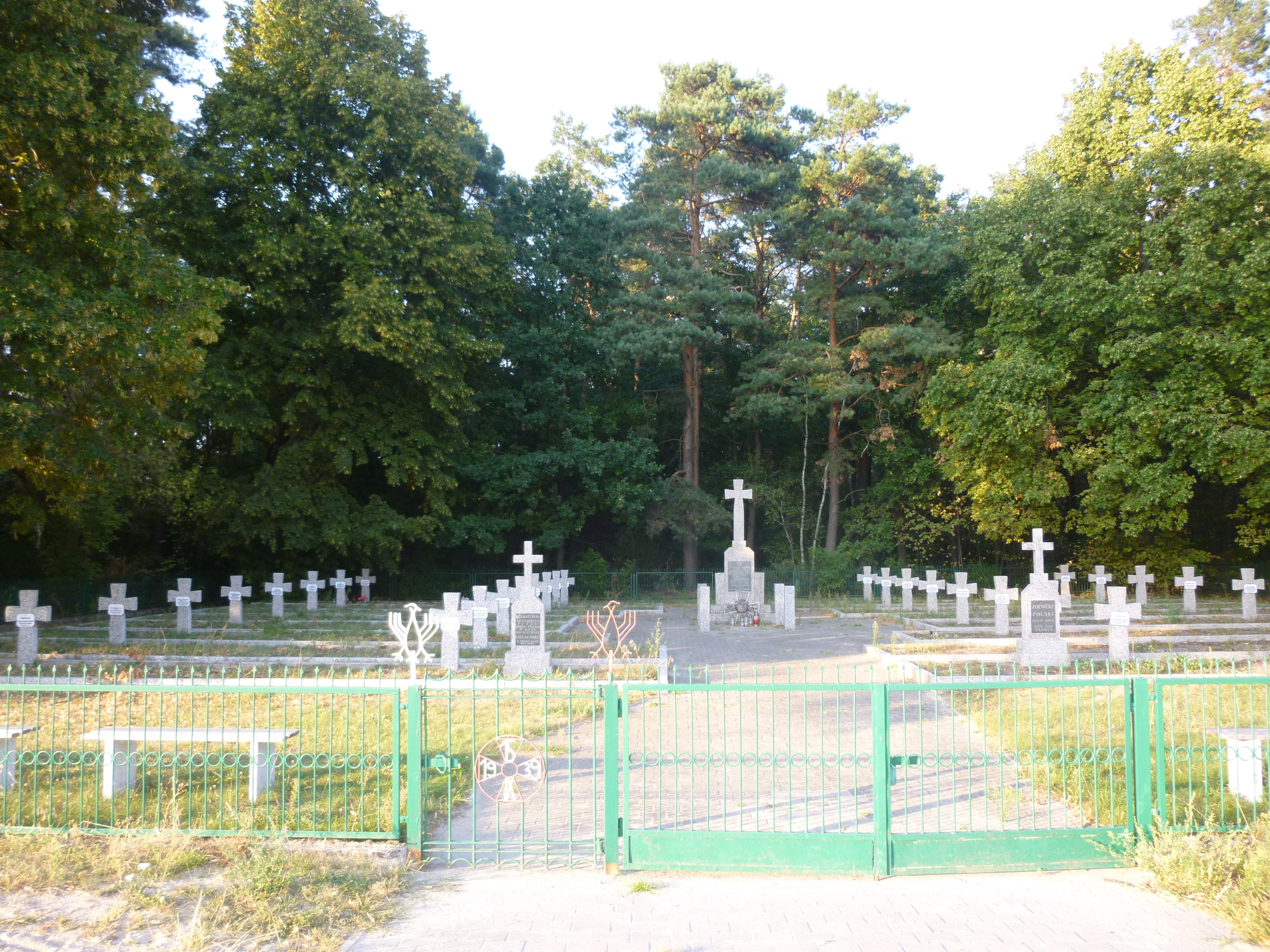
- Polish war cemetery from World War II in Guźnia

- Location within Poland
- Coordinates: 52°5′1″N 19°48′45″E
- Country: Poland
- Voivodeship: Łódź
- County: Łowicz
- Gmina: Łowicz
- Population: 175
- Time zone: UTC+1 (CET)
  - Summer (DST): UTC+2 (CEST)

Guźnia [ˈɡuʑɲa] is a village in the administrative district of Gmina Łowicz, within Łowicz County, Łódź Voivodeship, in central Poland. It is located within the historic region of Mazovia.

== History ==
Guźnia dates back to the 14th century, and was first mentioned in 1367. Its name is derived from the Old Polish word gozd ("forest"). Guźnia was a private church village within the Polish Crown, administratively located in the Rawa Voivodeship in the Greater Poland Province of the Polish Crown, owned by the Archdiocese of Gniezno. In the second half of the 16th century, the village was located in the administrative unit Sochaczew Land of the local government Rawa Voivodeship in the historical Kingdom of Poland. It belonged to the Chruślin estate of the Archbishops of Gniezn.

During the German invasion of Poland, which started World War II, on September 16, 1939, Wehrmacht troops murdered 12 Polish farmers from Guźnia and nearby Bocheń near the Rydwan lake, south Guźnia (see also Nazi crimes against the Polish nation). There is a Polish military cemetery in the village.
