= Gmina Łowicz =

Gmina Łowicz Łowicz Commune
- Gmina
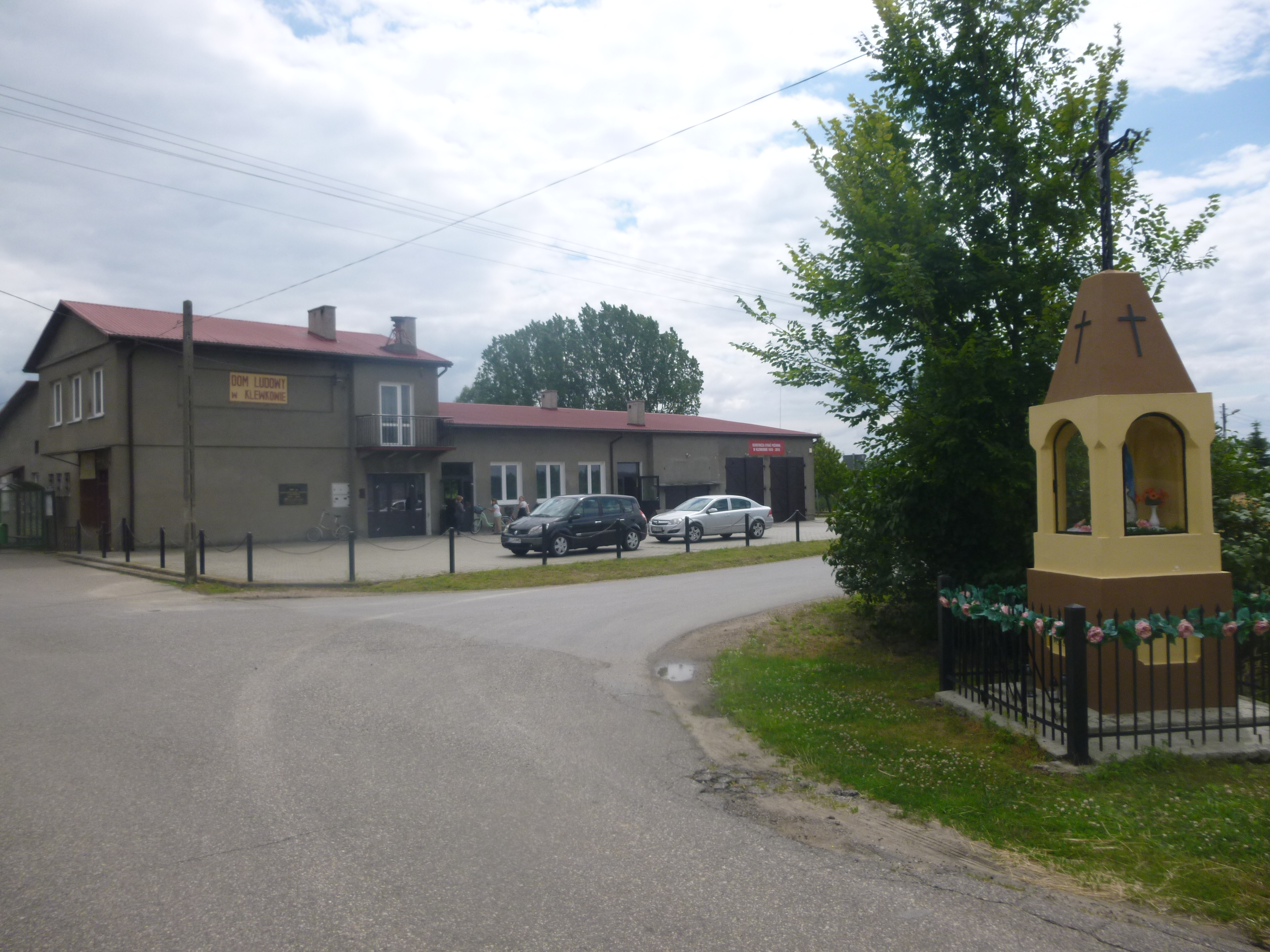

- Flag Coat of arms
- Interactive map of Gmina Łowicz
- Coordinates (Łowicz): 52°6′N 19°56′E
- Country: Poland
- Voivodeship: Łódź
- County: Łowicz
- Seat: Łowicz

Area
  - Total: 133.38 km^{2} (51.50 sq mi)

Population (2006)
  - Total: 7,444
  - Density: 55.81/km^{2} (144.5/sq mi)
- Website: www.gminalowicz.pl

Gmina Łowicz is a rural gmina (administrative district) in Łowicz County, Łódź Voivodeship, in central Poland. Its seat is the town of Łowicz, although the town is not part of the territory of the gmina.

The gmina covers an area of 133.38 square kilometres (51.5 sq mi), and as of 2006 its total population is 7,444.

== Villages ==
Gmina Łowicz contains the villages and settlements of:

- Bocheń
- Dąbkowice Dolne
- Dąbkowice Górne
- Guźnia
- Jamno
- Jastrzębia
- Klewków
- Małszyce
- Mystkowice
- Niedźwiada
- Ostrów
- Otolice
- Parma
- Pilaszków
- Placencja
- Popów
- Strzelcew
- Świące
- Świeryż Drugi
- Świeryż Pierwszy
- Szczudłów
- Urbańszczyzna
- Wygoda
- Zabostów Duży
- Zabostów Mały
- Zawady
- Zielkowice

== Neighbouring gminas ==
Gmina Łowicz is bordered by the town of Łowicz and by the gminas of Bielawy, Chąśno, Domaniewice, Kocierzew Południowy, Łyszkowice, Nieborów and Zduny.
