= Popivka =

Popivka (Ukrainian: Попівка) is a Ukrainian placename and it may refer to:

- Popivka, Konotop Raion, Sumy Oblast, Ukraine
- Popivka, Okhtyrka Raion, Sumy Oblast, Ukraine
- Popivka, Sumy Raion, Sumy Oblast, Ukraine
- Smyrnove, formerly Popivka, a village in Polohy Raion, Zaporizhzhia Oblast, Ukraine
- Popivka River, a tributary of the Sluch in Ukraine

== See also ==
- Popovka (disambiguation), the equivalent Russian-language placename
