= Strzelcew =

- Village
- Location within Poland
- Coordinates: 52°8′N 19°59′E
- Country: Poland
- Voivodeship: Łódź
- County: Łowicz
- Gmina: Łowicz

Strzelcew [ˈstʂɛlt͡sɛf] is a village in the administrative district of Gmina Łowicz, within Łowicz County, Łódź Voivodeship, in central Poland.
