= Popów, Łowicz County =

Popów
- Village
- Location within Poland
- Coordinates: 52°7′18″N 19°59′2″E
- Country: Poland
- Voivodeship: Łódź
- County: Łowicz
- Gmina: Łowicz

Popów [ˈpɔpuf] is a village in the administrative district of Gmina Łowicz, within Łowicz County, Łódź Voivodeship, in central Poland.
