= Niedźwiada, Łódź Voivodeship =

Niedźwiada
- Village
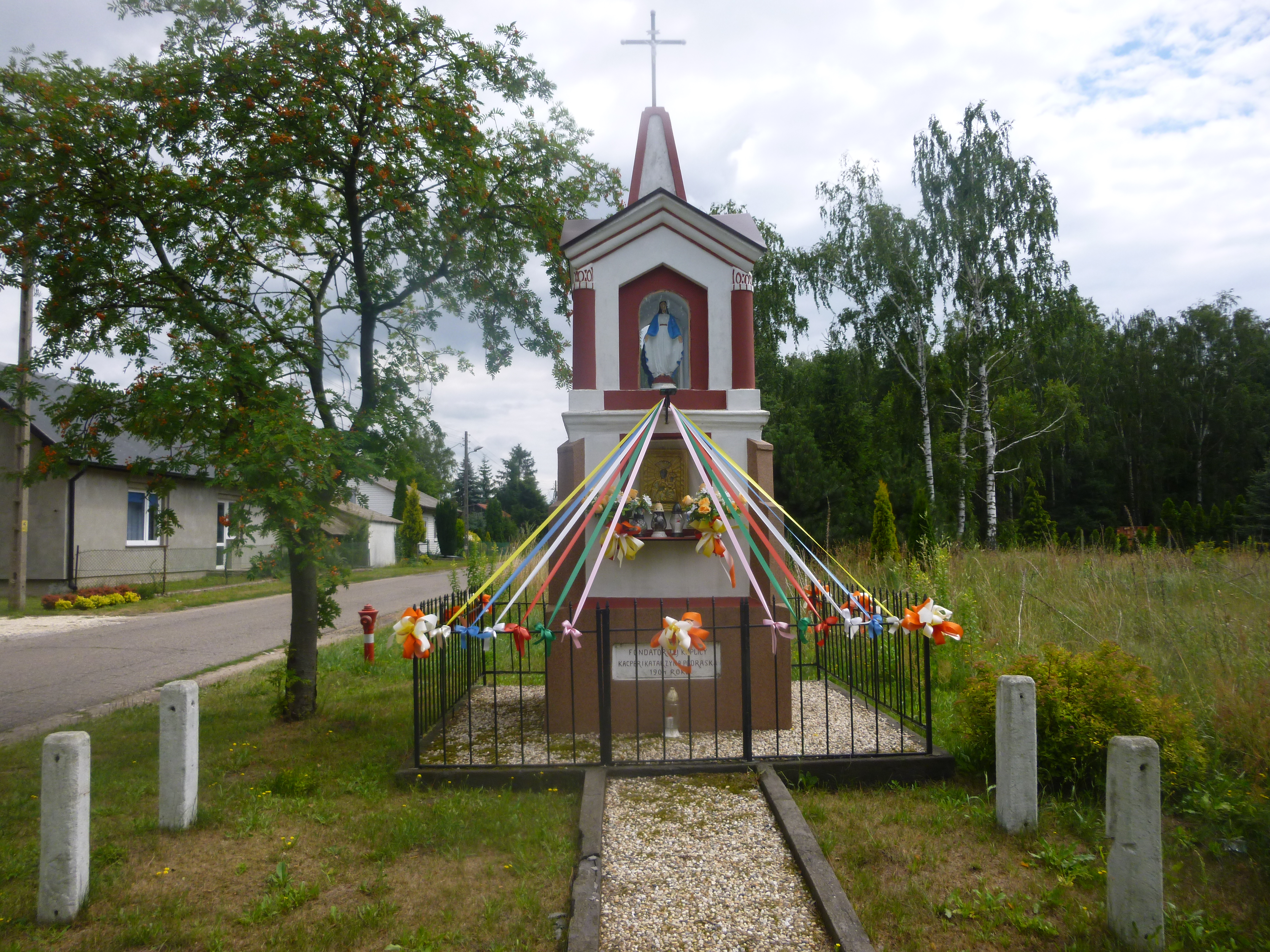
- A chapel in Niedźwiad, Łódź province.

- Location within Poland
- Coordinates: 52°9′N 19°55′E
- Country: Poland
- Voivodeship: Łódź
- County: Łowicz
- Gmina: Łowicz

Niedźwiada [ɲɛd͡ʑˈvjada] is a village in the administrative district of Gmina Łowicz, within Łowicz County, Łódź Voivodeship, in central Poland.
