= Popovka, Ternovsky District, Voronezh Oblast =

Popovka Поповка
- Selo
- Location within Voronezh Oblast Location within Russia
- Coordinates: 51°32′N 41°43′E
- Country: Russia
- Region: Voronezh Oblast
- District: Ternovsky District
- Time zone: UTC+3:00

Popovka (Russian: Поповка) is a rural locality (a selo) in Narodnenskoye Rural Settlement, Ternovsky District, Voronezh Oblast, Russia. The population was 246 as of 2010. There are 5 streets.

== Geography ==
Popovka is located on the right bank of the Karachan River, 30 km southeast of Ternovka (the district's administrative centre) by road. Narodnoye is the nearest rural locality.
