= Pilaszków, Łódź Voivodeship =

Pilaszków
- Village
- Location within Poland
- Coordinates: 52°5′29″N 19°52′45″E
- Country: Poland
- Voivodeship: Łódź
- County: Łowicz
- Gmina: Łowicz

Pilaszków [piˈlaʂkuf] is a village in the administrative district of Gmina Łowicz, within Łowicz County, Łódź Voivodeship, in central Poland.
