= Popovka, Rossoshansky District, Voronezh Oblast =

Popovka Поповка
- Selo
- Location within Voronezh Oblast Location within Russia
- Coordinates: 50°18′N 39°37′E
- Country: Russia
- Region: Voronezh Oblast
- District: Rossoshansky District
- Time zone: UTC+3:00

Popovka (Russian: Поповка) is a rural locality (a selo) and the administrative center of Popovskoye Rural Settlement, Rossoshansky District, Voronezh Oblast, Russia. The population was 2,507 as of 2010. There are 33 streets.

== Geography ==
Popovka is located 16 km north of Rossosh (the district's administrative centre) by road. Sud-Nikolayevka is the nearest rural locality.

== Ukrainian Offensive ==
In March 2025, Ukraine launched several small offensives into the Belgorod and Voronezh regions in Russia. On March 24, 2025 Ukrainian forces had reportedly entered the settlement and captured it.
