= Popovka, Kharovsky District, Vologda Oblast =

Popovka Поповка
- Village
- Location within Vologda Oblast Location within Russia
- Coordinates: 60°15′N 39°40′E
- Country: Russia
- Region: Vologda Oblast
- District: Kharovsky District
- Time zone: UTC+3:00

Popovka (Russian: Поповка) is a rural locality (a village) and the administrative center of Azletskoye Rural Settlement, Kharovsky District, Vologda Oblast, Russia. The population was 139 as of 2002.

== Geography ==
Popovka is located 52 km northwest of Kharovsk (the district's administrative centre) by road. Ostretsovskaya is the nearest rural locality.
