= Valentina Tereshkova =

Russian cosmonaut and politician (born 1937)

- Валентина Терешкова
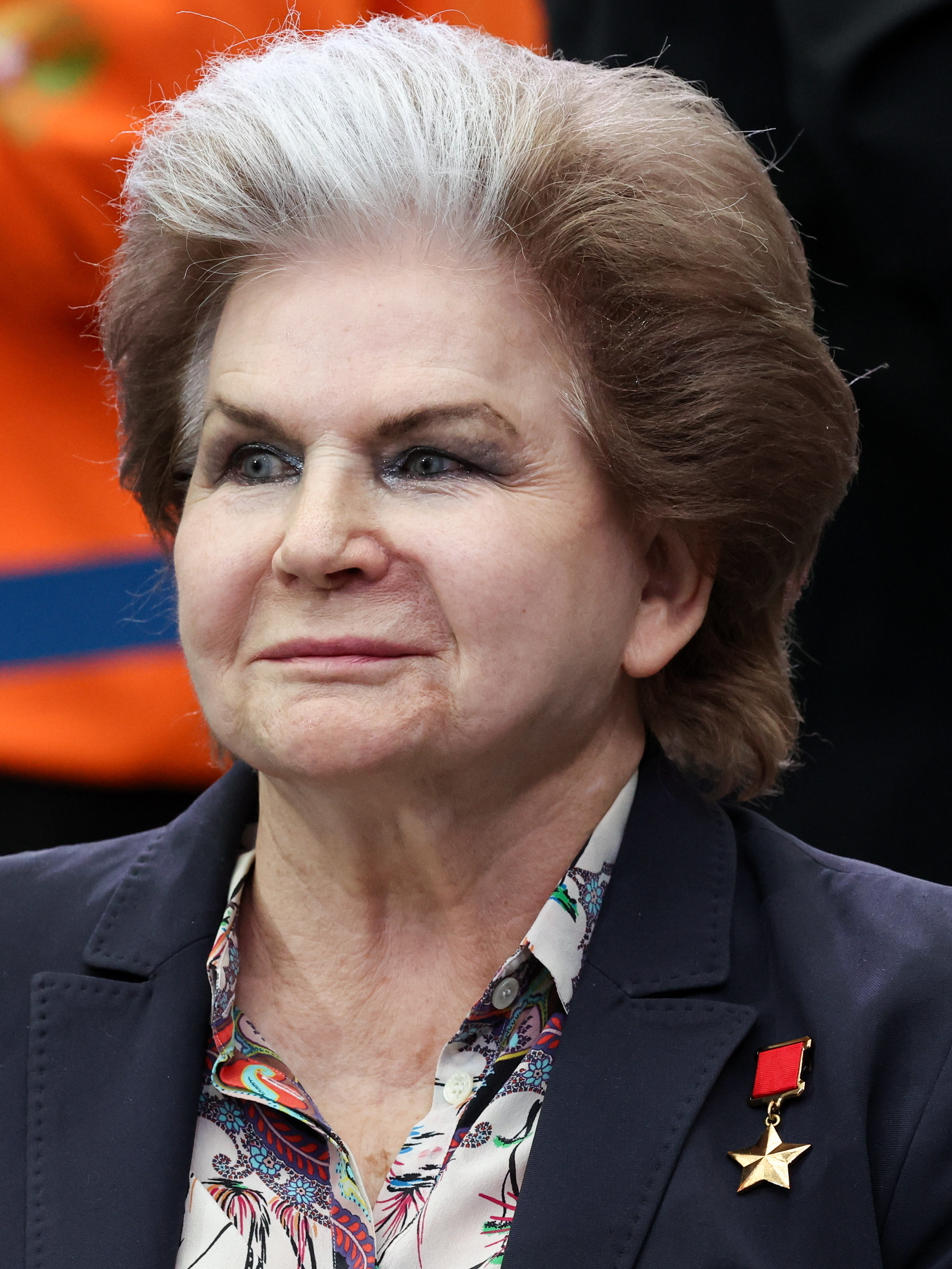
- Tereshkova in 2024

Member of the State Duma
- Incumbent
- Assumed office 21 December 2011

Member of the Yaroslavl Oblast Duma
- In office 2 March 2008 – 21 December 2011

Member of the Presidium of the Supreme Soviet of the Soviet Union
- In office 24 July 1974 – 25 May 1989

Member of the Supreme Soviet of the Soviet Union
- In office 12 June 1966 – 25 May 1989

Personal details
- Born: 6 March 1937 (age 89) Bolshoye Maslennikovo, Yaroslavl Oblast, Soviet Union
- Party: United Russia (since 2008)
- Other political affiliations: CPSU (1960–1991); Our Home – Russia (1995); Russian Party of Life (2003)
- Spouses: Andriyan Nikolayev (m. 1963; div. 1982) Yuli Shaposhnikov (m. 1982; died 1999)
- Children: 1
- Occupation: Pilot; cosmonaut; politician
- Awards
- Other name: Valentina Nikolayeva-Tereshkova
- Space career

Soviet cosmonaut
- Rank: Major general, Russian Air Force (1962–1997)
- Time in space: 2 days, 22 hours, and 50 mins
- Selection: 1st female group
- Mission: Vostok 6

Valentina Vladimirovna Tereshkova (Note: Russian: Валентина Владимировна Терешкова, IPA: [vəlʲɪnʲˈtʲinə vlɐˈdʲimʲɪrəvnə tʲɪrʲɪʂˈkovə]) (Note: In this name that follows East Slavic naming customs, the patronymic is Vladimirovna and the family name is Tereshkova.) (born 6 March 1937) is a Russian engineer, politician, and former Soviet cosmonaut. She was the first woman in space, having flown a solo mission on Vostok 6 on 16 June 1963. She orbited the Earth 48 times, spent almost three days in space, and is the only woman to have been on a solo space mission. She is the last surviving Vostok programme cosmonaut. At just twenty-six years old at the time of her spaceflight, she remains the youngest and first woman to orbit Earth. During her cosmonaut career, Tereshkova entered the political arena, serving in the Supreme Soviet from 1966 to 1989. Since 2011, she serves as a Member of the State Duma.

Before her selection for the Soviet space programme, Tereshkova was a textile factory worker and an amateur skydiver. She joined the Air Force as part of the Cosmonaut Corps and was commissioned as an officer after completing her training. After the dissolution of the first group of female cosmonauts in 1969, Tereshkova remained in the space programme as a cosmonaut instructor. She later graduated from the Zhukovsky Air Force Engineering Academy and re-qualified for spaceflight, but never went to space again. She retired from the Air Force in 1997, attaining the rank of major general.

Tereshkova was a prominent member of the Communist Party of the Soviet Union, holding various political offices. This includes, in addition to the Supreme Soviet, serving as Member of its Presidium from 1974 to 1989. She remained politically active following the collapse of the Soviet Union, but twice lost elections to the national State Duma, in 1995 and 2003. In 2008, she was to her regional parliament, the Yaroslavl Oblast Duma, before running again for the State Duma in 2011, this time successfully as a member of the ruling United Russia party. She was re-elected in 2016, 2021 and 2026. Tereshkova has the federal state civilian service rank of 1st class Active State Councillor of the Russian Federation. In 2020, she successfully proposed lifting the term limit for President Vladimir Putin. In 2022, she voted to recognise the breaking away of the Donetsk and Lugansk regions from Ukraine, for which she was placed on the international sanctions list of various countries.

== Early life ==
Valentina Tereshkova was born on 6 March 1937 in the Bolshoye Maslennikovo, a village on the Volga River 270 kilometres (170 mi) northeast of Moscow and part of the Yaroslavl Oblast in central Russia. Her parents had migrated from Belarus. Her father, Vladimir Tereshkov, was a former tractor driver and a sergeant in command of a tank in the Soviet Army. He died in the Finnish Winter War when Tereshkova was two years of age. He and her mother Elena Fyodorovna Tereshkova had three children. After her father's death, her mother moved the family to Yaroslavl, seeking better employment opportunities, and was employed at the Krasny Perekop cotton mill.

Tereshkova was first enrolled in school at 8 years old and graduated at 16. She began working at a tire factory, and later at a textile mill, but continued her education by taking correspondence courses and graduated from the Light Industry Technical School in 1960. Tereshkova also became interested from a young age in parachuting, and trained in skydiving at the local Aeroclub, making her first jump at age 22, on 21 May 1959. While still employed as a textile worker, she trained as a competitive parachutist, keeping this a secret from her family. Tereshkova also joined the local Komsomol (Communist Youth League) in Yaroslavl, serving as the secretary of the organisation in 1960 and 1961. She became a member of the Communist Party in 1962.

== Soviet space programme ==
=== Selection and training ===
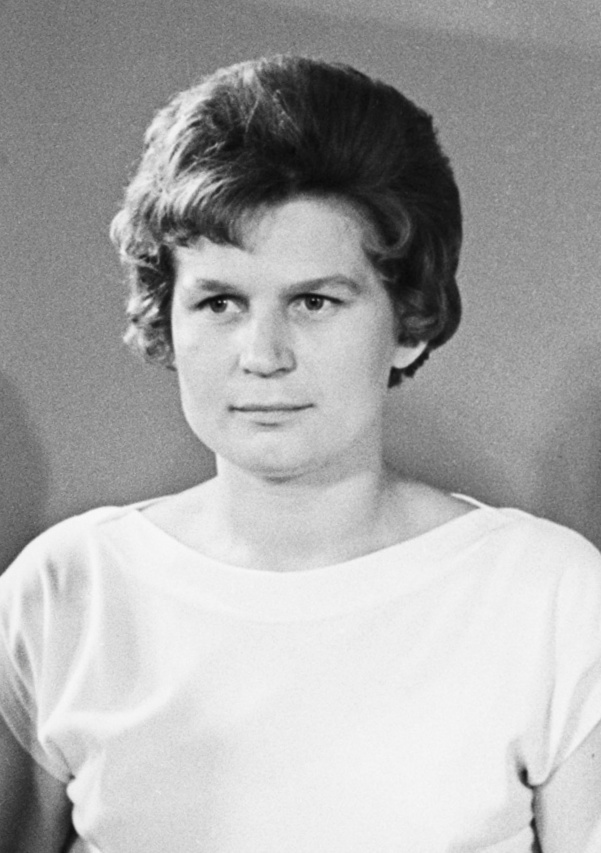
Tereshkova in January 1963

Tereshkova had not expressed any particular desire to go into space before being recruited. Rather, her experience at skydiving contributed to her selection as a cosmonaut. After the flight of Yuri Gagarin in 1961, Nikolai Kamanin, director of cosmonaut training, read in the American media that female pilots were training to be astronauts as part of Mercury 13. In his diary, he wrote, "We cannot allow that the first woman in space will be American. This would be an insult to the patriotic feelings of Soviet women." Approval was granted to place five female cosmonauts in the next group, which would begin training in 1963. To increase the odds of sending a Soviet woman into space first, the female cosmonauts began their training before the men. The rules required that the potential cosmonaut be a parachutist under 30 years of age, less than 170 cm (5 ft 7 in) in height, and no more than 70 kg (154 lb) in weight. By January 1962, the All-Union Voluntary Society for Assistance to the Army, Air Force and Navy (DOSAAF) had selected 400 candidates for consideration. After the initial screening, 58 of those candidates met the requirements, which Kamanin reduced to 23. On 16 February 1962, Tereshkova was selected, along with four other candidates, to join the female cosmonaut corps.

Since they had no military experience, they started with the rank of private in the Soviet Air Forces. Training included isolation tests, centrifuge tests, thermo-chamber tests, decompression chamber testing, and pilot training in MiG-15UTI jet fighters. Tereshkova underwent water recovery training at sea, as part of which several motorboats were used to agitate the water, in order to simulate the rough conditions of space travel. She also began studying at the Zhukovsky Air Force Engineering Academy and graduated a few years after her flight. The group spent several months in basic training and, after they finished their training and passed an examination, Kamanin offered them the option to be commissioned as regular Air Force officers. With advice from the male cosmonauts, they chose to accept Kamanin's offer, as it would make it harder for the programme to get rid of them after the first flight. All five women became junior lieutenants in the Air Force in December 1962. Tatyana Kuznetsova became ineligible for the first flight due to illness, and Zhanna Yorkina was performing poorly in training, leaving Tereshkova, Irina Solovyova, and Valentina Ponomaryova as the leading candidates.

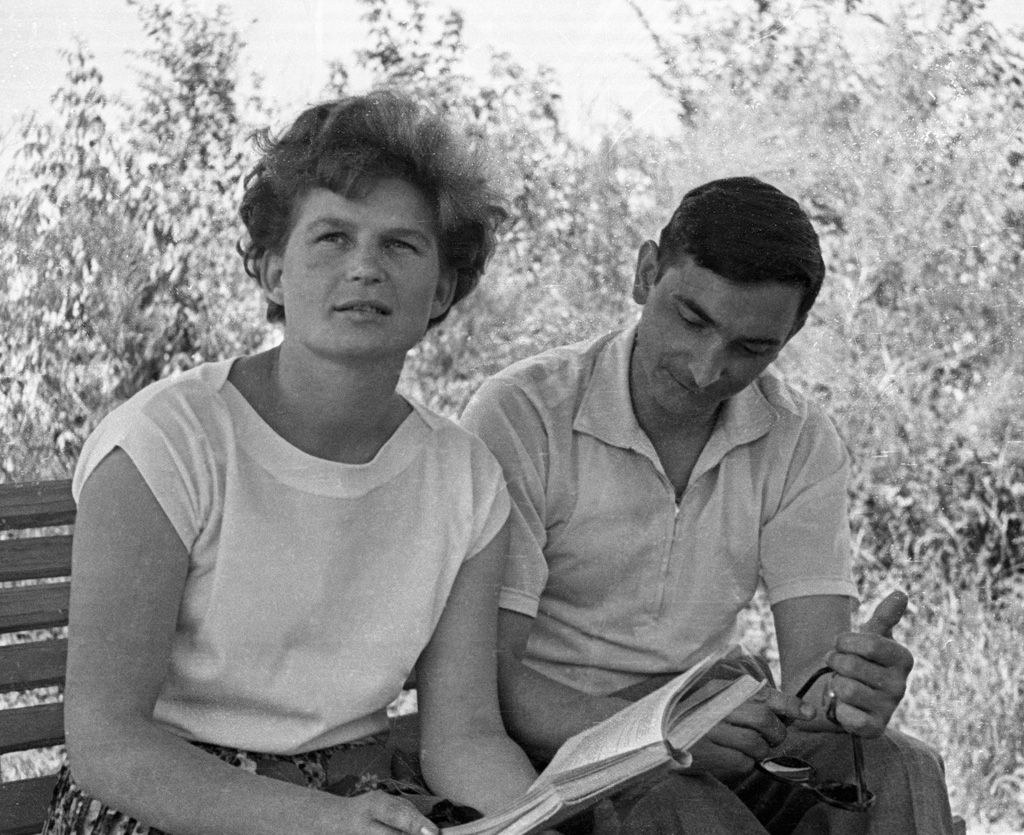
Tereshkova and Valery Bykovsky a few weeks before their mission

Originally, a joint mission profile was developed that would involve launching two women into space, on solo Vostok flights, on consecutive days in March or April 1963. It was intended that Tereshkova would launch first, in Vostok 5, while Ponomaryova would follow her into orbit in Vostok 6. However, this flight plan was altered in March 1963. Vostok 5 would now carry a male cosmonaut, Valery Bykovsky, flying alongside a woman aboard Vostok 6, both to be launched in June 1963. The State Space Commission, at their meeting on 21 May, nominated Tereshkova to pilot Vostok 6. Kamanin called her "Gagarin in a skirt." Soviet Premier Nikita Khrushchev was happy with the propaganda potential of her selection, since she was the daughter of a collective farm worker who had died in the Winter War; he confirmed her selection. Solovyova was appointed as her first backup. Tereshkova was promoted to lieutenant before her flight and to captain mid-flight.

=== Vostok 6 ===
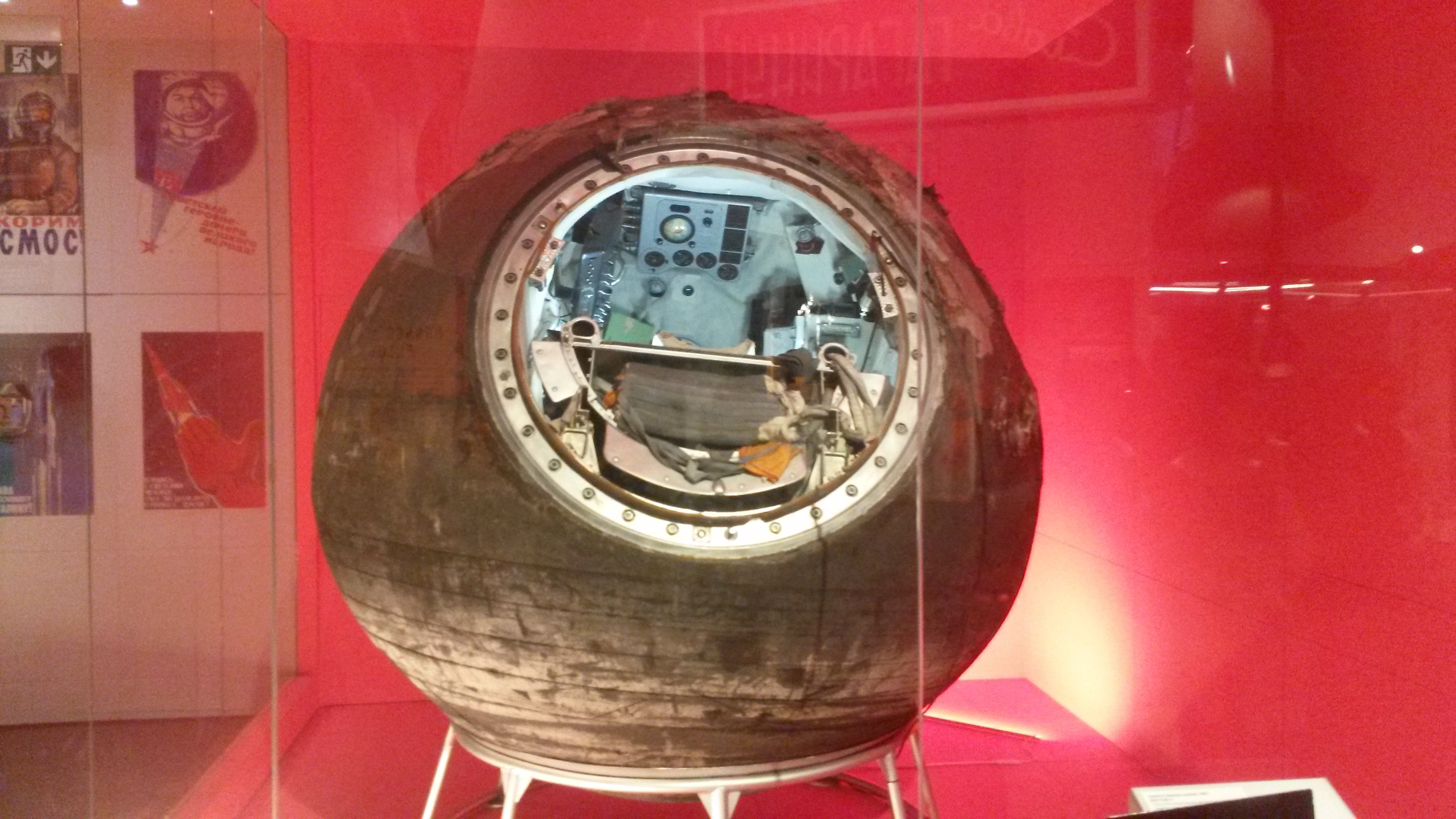
Vostok 6 capsule on temporary display in the Science Museum, London in 2016

After the successful launch of Vostok 5 on 14 June, Tereshkova began final preparations for her own flight. On the morning of 16 June 1963, Tereshkova and her backup Solovyova were both dressed in spacesuits and taken to the launch pad by bus. Following the tradition set by Gagarin, Tereshkova also urinated on the bus tire, becoming the first woman to do so. After completing her communication- and life-support checks, she was sealed inside the Vostok. After a two-hour countdown, Vostok 6 launched faultlessly, and Tereshkova became the first woman in space; she remains the only woman to have flown into space solo, and, at 26 years of age, the youngest. (Note: Gherman Titov is the youngest man to have flown into space: he was 25.) Her call sign on this flight was Chaika. In commemoration, this name was later bestowed on an asteroid, 1671 Chaika. After her launch, she radioed down:

It is I, Seagull! Everything is fine. I see the horizon; it's a sky blue with a dark strip. How beautiful the Earth is ... everything is going well.

Vostok 6 was the final Vostok flight and was launched two days after Vostok 5 which carried Bykovsky into a five-day mission. The two vessels spent three days in orbital planes 30° apart and, during Tereshkova's first orbit, approached each other to within 5 km (3.1 mi). Although they were able to communicate by radio, neither could be sure if they saw each other. Cameras placed inside both the spacecraft transmitted live footage that was broadcast on Soviet state television. Tereshkova also maintained a flight log and took photographs of the horizon, which were later used to identify aerosol layers within the atmosphere.

In this single flight, she logged more flight time than the combined times of all American astronauts who had flown before that date. Her mission was used to continue the medical studies on humans in spaceflight and offered comparative data about the effects of space travel on women. Although Tereshkova experienced nausea and physical discomfort for much of the flight, she orbited the earth 48 times and spent 2 days, 22 hours, and 50 minutes in space.

As planned in all Vostok missions, Tereshkova ejected from the capsule during its descent at about four miles above the Earth and made a parachute landing 620 km (385 mi) north-east of Karaganda, Kazakhstan at 8:20 am UTC on 19 June. Bykovsky landed three hours after her.

Tereshkova later disclosed that she encountered challenges in managing her parachute due to violent gusts of wind. However, she landed safely but received a bruise on her nose, then she had dinner with some local villagers in the Altai Krai who helped her to get out of her spacesuit.

== After the Vostok 6 flight ==
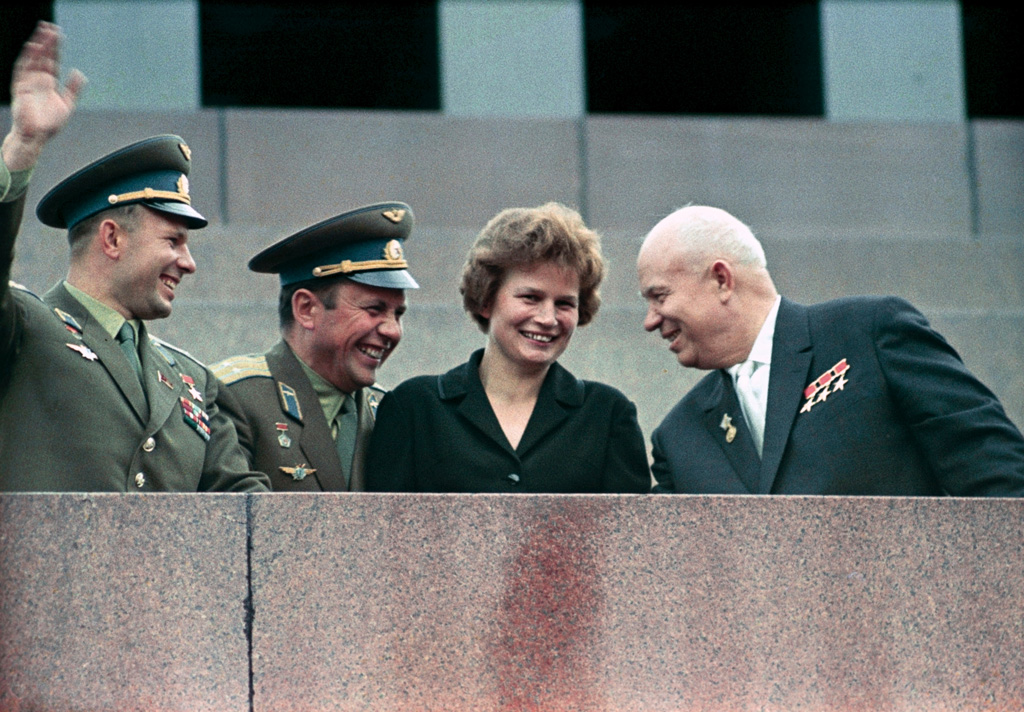
Yuri Gagarin, Pavel Popovich, Tereshkova, and Nikita Khrushchev at Lenin's Mausoleum on 22 June 1963

According to the Russian newspaper Pravda, one million flowers were brought in to celebrate the success of the dual flights and greet the cosmonauts in Moscow. On 22 June 1963, Khrushchev greeted Bykovsky dressed in his uniform who saluted while Khrushchev hugged and kissed Tereshkova who was dressed in civilian attire. In front of the thousands in attendance, the Premier also announced that both the cosmonauts were awarded the Hero of the Soviet Union medal. All three made speeches from atop Lenin's Tomb on the Red Square; Tereshkova said, "my father perished defending our country and my mother brought up her three children. We know the bitterness of that war. We don't need war," referring to the anniversary of the German invasion of Russia that began 22 years ago that day. Sometime after her mission, she was reportedly asked how the Soviet Union should thank her for her service to the country; Tereshkova requested that the government search for and publish the location of where her father was killed in action. This was done, and a monument was erected at the site in the Lemetti, Karelia—now on the Russian side of the border. The evening of 22 June, a reception was held in the Kremlin in which both Bykovsky and Tereshkova were awarded the Order of Lenin.

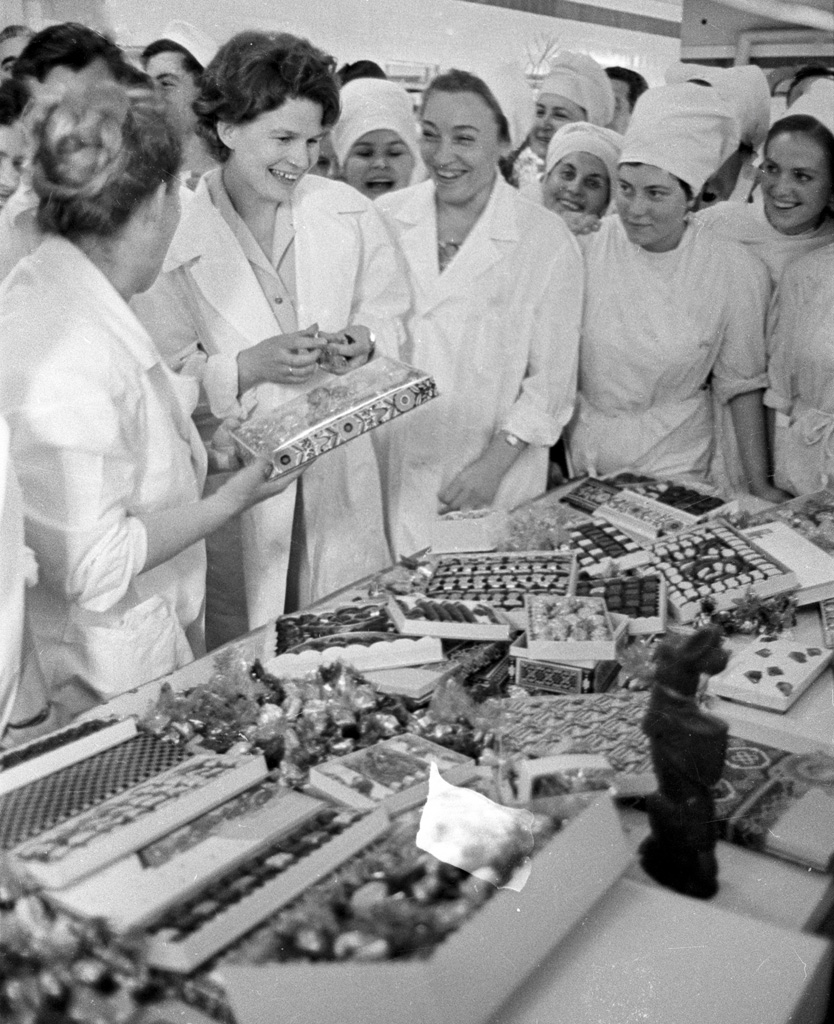
Tereshkova visiting the Lvov confectionery, Ukrainian SSR, 1967

Less than a week after her return from space, Moscow hosted the International Women's Congress on 24 June where Tereshkova and Bykovsky were greeted by a gathering of about 2,000 women from 119 countries. Of all the Russian cosmonauts, Tereshkova received the most requests to visit foreign nations. Her trips in particular required approval from the Ministry of Foreign Affairs, the Ministry of Defense, and the KGB and were ultimately authorized by the Presidium of the Central Committee of the Communist Party, the highest political bureau in the Soviet Union.

All the Vostok cosmonauts toured extensively, but Tereshkova most of all; she made 42 trips abroad between 1963 and 1970. On 1 October 1963, Tereshkova arrived in Havana, Cuba, and met Fidel Castro. She toured the country which at the time was dealing with the effects of Hurricane Flora. The following month she presented a silver cup, which went to the team from the Soviet Union who won gold in all five boat classes, at the women's 1963 European Rowing Championships held in Khimki near Moscow. By February 1964, Tereshkova was pregnant when she visited Elizabeth II of the United Kingdom who was also expecting at the time. Except for a break of a few months that year, Tereshkova went on a continuous and exhausting world tour, returning to her public duties only two months after the birth of her daughter.

After her spaceflight, Tereshkova became a national and international role model. She received "congratulatory telegrams and letters... from around the world." These telegrams express the impact that Tereshkova had on other countries, outside the Soviet Union. Women were particularly excited about her flight. For example, in New Delhi, Tereshkova was described as a "feminist standard bearer bringing a message of hope for 'enslaved' Indian womanhood."

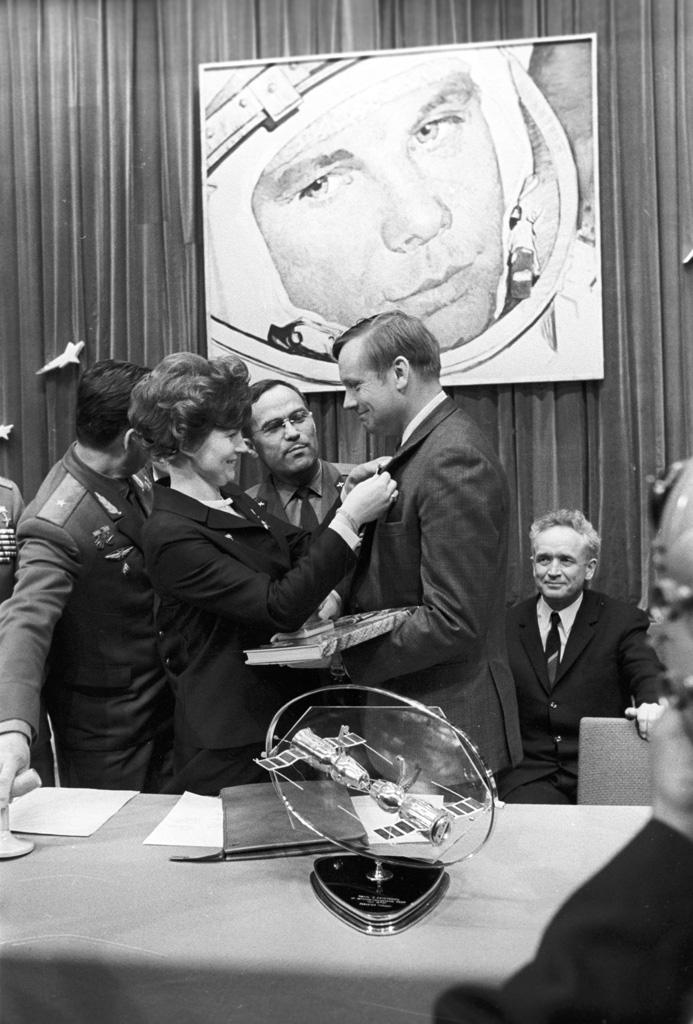
Tereshkova with Neil Armstrong in 1970

Tereshkova was a well-known representative of the Soviet Union abroad. She became a member of the World Peace Council in 1966 and a member of the Yaroslavl Soviet in 1967. She was also the Soviet representative to the UN Conference for the International Women's Year in Mexico City in 1975. She led the Soviet delegation to the World Conference on Women in Copenhagen and was "interested in socialist internationalism and women's roles in guaranteeing world peace". Tereshkova was also chosen for several political positions; she was a member of the Supreme Soviet of the Soviet Union (1966–1974), a member of the Central Committee of the Communist Party (1969–1991), and a member of the Presidium of the Supreme Soviet (1974–1989). She was appointed vice president of the International Woman's Democratic Federation and president of the Soviet-Algerian Friendship Society.

Although she desired to continue pursuing a career as a cosmonaut and engineer, her superiors had a different plan for her in politics. Following Gagarin's death, the Soviet space programme was not willing to risk losing another hero. Against her wishes, she was appointed as the leader of the Committee for Soviet Women in 1968. A few months after she graduated with honours from the Zhukovsky Air Force Engineering Academy in October 1969, the team of women cosmonauts was disbanded and a woman would not go to space again until Svetlana Savitskaya in 1982, after a gap of 19 years.

By 1976, Tereshkova was a colonel in the Soviet Air Forces. In April 1977, she earned a doctorate in aeronautical engineering and underwent the medical examinations to qualify for spaceflight when a selection of a new class of women cosmonauts was announced in 1978. Although she did not go to space again, she remained an instructor at the Yuri Gagarin Cosmonaut Training Center.

== Later political career ==
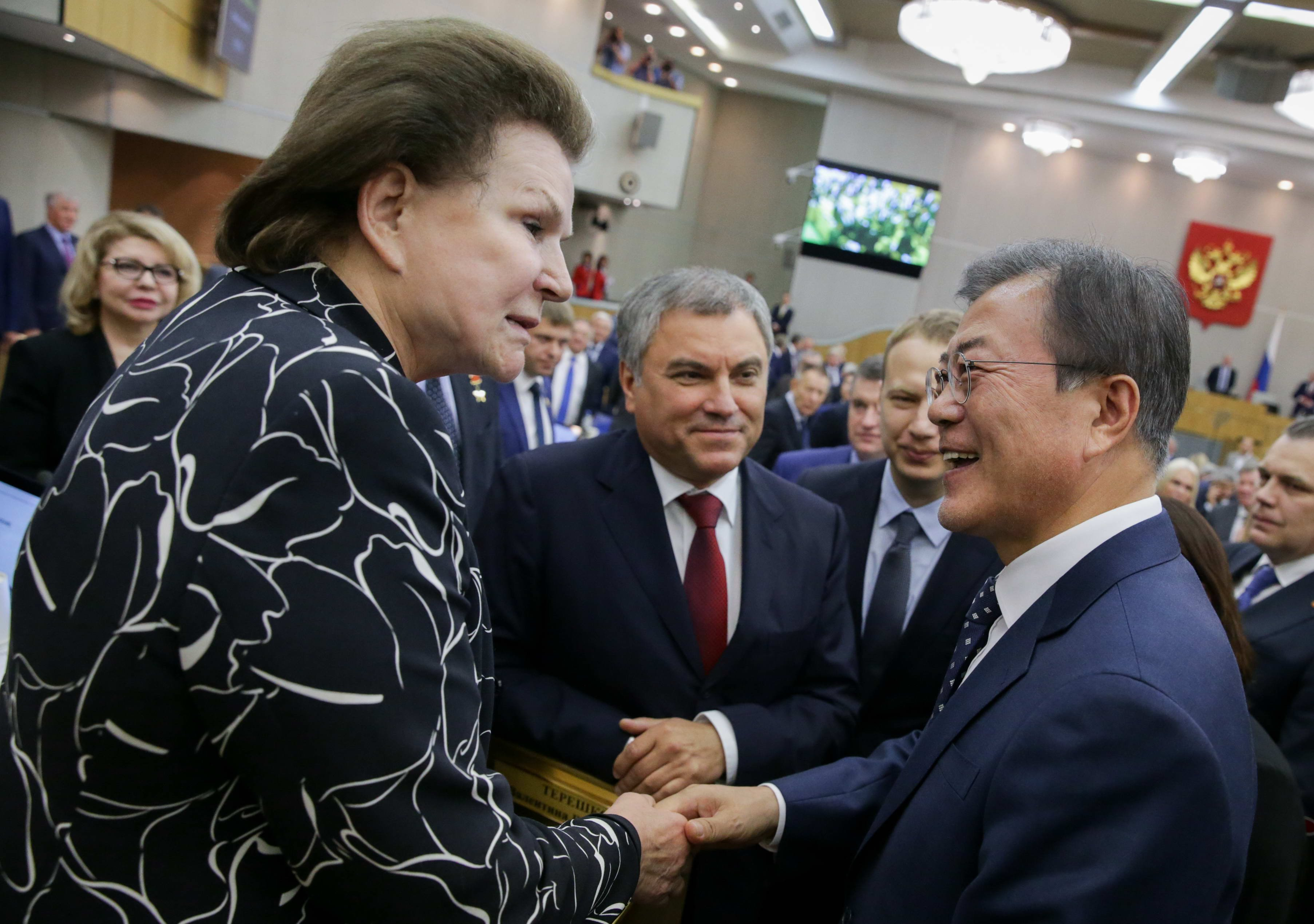
Tereshkova with South Korean President Moon Jae-in in the Russian State Duma, 2018

She remained politically active following the collapse of the Soviet Union but lost elections to the national State Duma in 1995. In the year 1995, Tereshkova was promoted to an honorary rank of major general. On 28 April 1997, she left the Russian Air Force due to reaching the age of compulsory retirement of 60 years old. In 2003, Tereshkova ran again for a seat in the State Duma. In 2007, Tereshkova was invited to Prime Minister Vladimir Putin's residence in Novo-Ogaryovo for the celebration of her 70th birthday. While there she said that she would like to fly to Mars, even if it meant that it was a one-way trip. She was later elected during 2008 to her regional parliament, the Yaroslavl Oblast Duma.

On 4 December 2011, Tereshkova was elected to the State Duma, the lower house of the Russian legislature, as a representative of the Yaroslavl Oblast and a member of the United Russia party. In the 6th State Duma, together with Yelena Mizulina, Irina Yarovaya and Andrey Skoch, she was a member of the inter-factional committee for the protection of Christian values. In this capacity, she supported the introduction of amendments to the preamble of Constitution of Russia, to add that "Orthodoxy is the basis of Russia's national and cultural identity". These views stand in opposition to atheist views Tereshkova espoused during the Soviet era that were aligned with the official Communist Party line at the time, such as calling religion "a big evil".

On 18 September 2016, Tereshkova was re-elected to the 7th State Duma. She serves as deputy chairperson of the Committee on the Federal Structure and Local Government.

In response to her support for the Russian invasion of Ukraine, the Office of Foreign Assets Control of the United States Department of the Treasury added Tereshkova to the Specially Designated Nationals and Blocked Persons List on 30 September 2022, which results in her assets being frozen and U.S. persons being prohibited from dealing with her. In December 2022, the European Union (EU) had placed sanctions on various Russian-media personalities and politicians including Tereshkova, which involves freezing assets and banning them from entering EU member states.

== Personal life ==
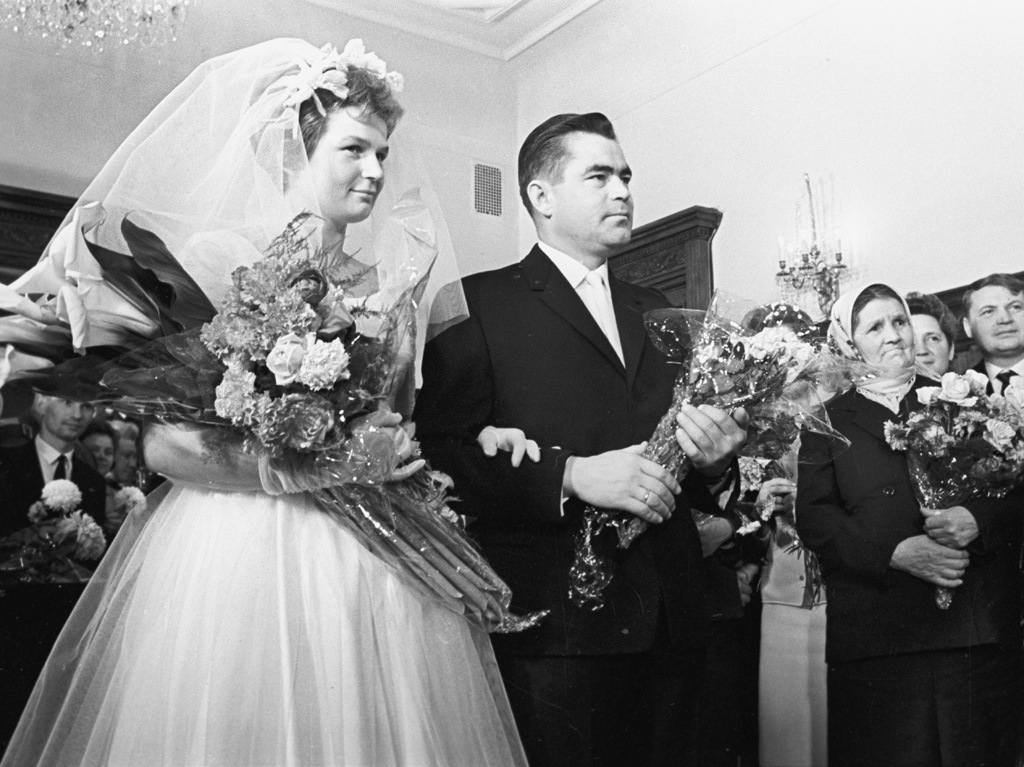
Tereshkova and Andriyan Nikolayev's wedding ceremony, 3 November 1963.

Tereshkova married cosmonaut Andriyan Nikolayev on 3 November 1963 at the Moscow Wedding Palace with Khrushchev presiding at the wedding party together with top government and space programme leaders. The marriage was encouraged by the Soviet space authorities as a "fairy-tale message to the country". General Kamanin, head of the space programme, described it as "probably useful for politics and science". On 8 June 1964, nearly one year after her space flight, she gave birth to their daughter Elena Andrianovna Nikolaeva-Tereshkova, the first person whose parents had both travelled into space.

Later in their marriage, the couple grew apart and refused to even stand next to each other in photographs. Tereshkova told the biographer Antonella Kerr that the marriage ended in 1977; she and Nikolayev divorced in 1982 and Tereshkova married Yuli Shaposhnikov, a surgeon she had met during her medical examinations to re-qualify as a cosmonaut. (Note: French & Burgess (2009), p. 326, states that she married Shaposhnikov in 1979.) They remained married until Shaposhnikov's death in 1999.

== Awards and honours ==
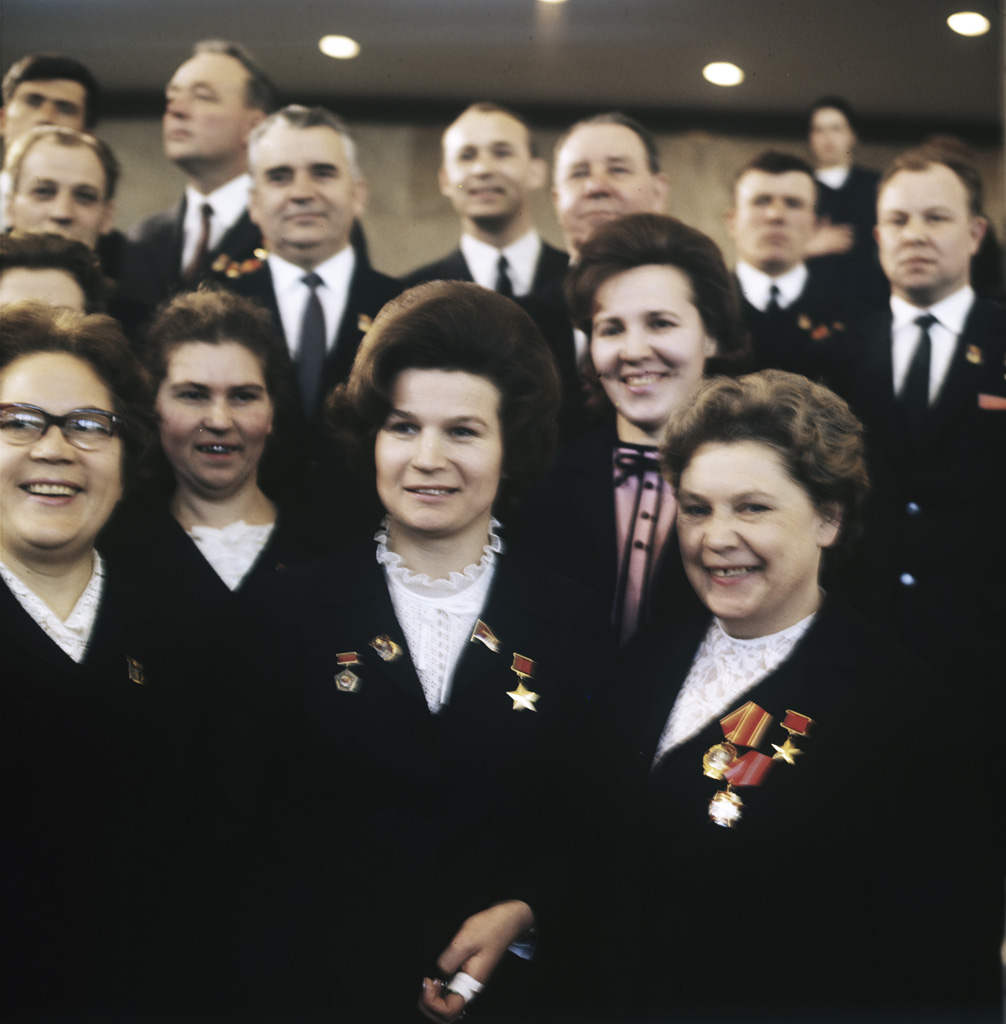
Tereshkova among delegates at the 24th Congress of the CPSU, 1971

=== Russian ===
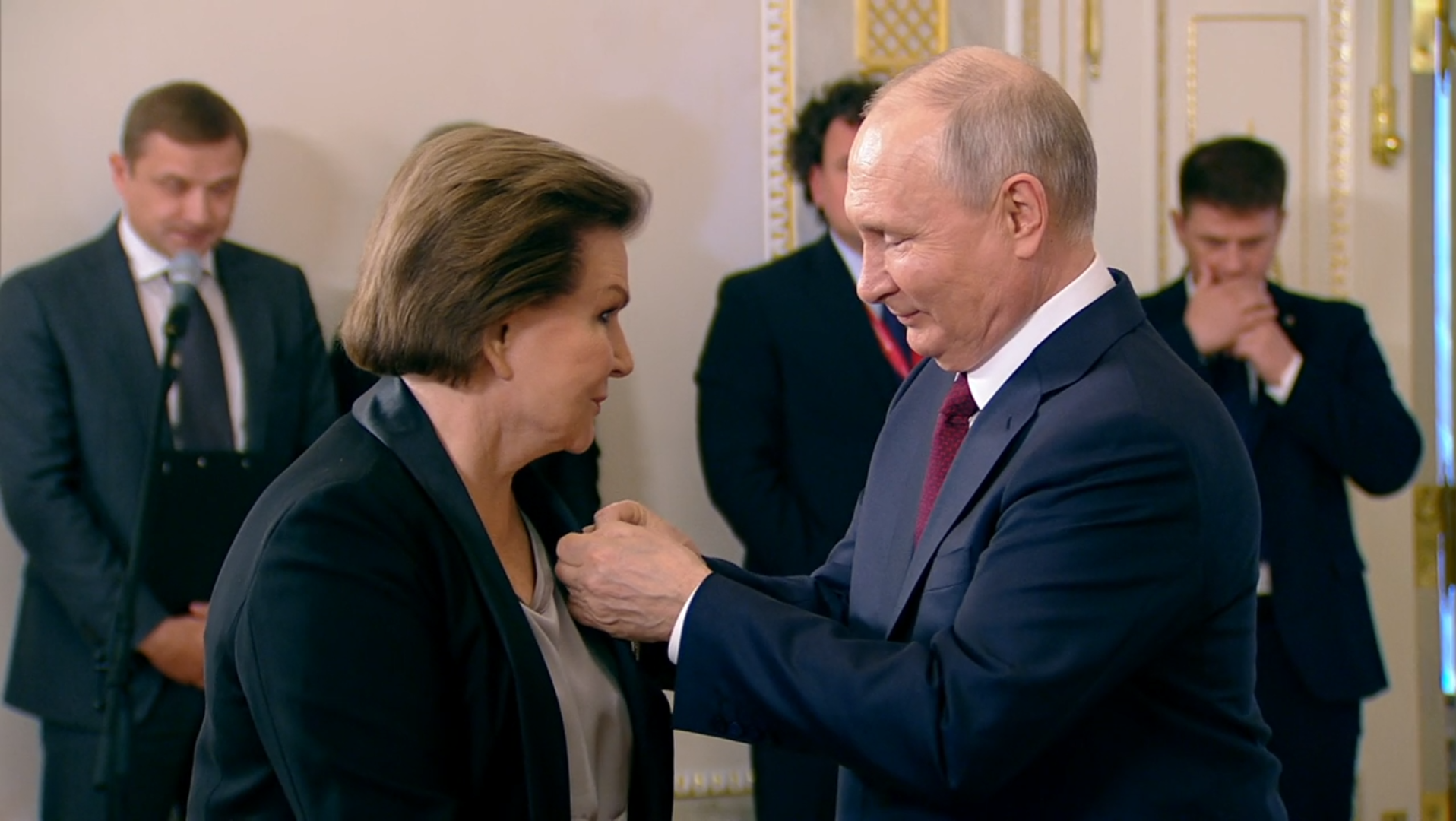
Russian President Vladimir Putin awarding to Order of Gagarin, Saint Petersburg, 16 June 2023

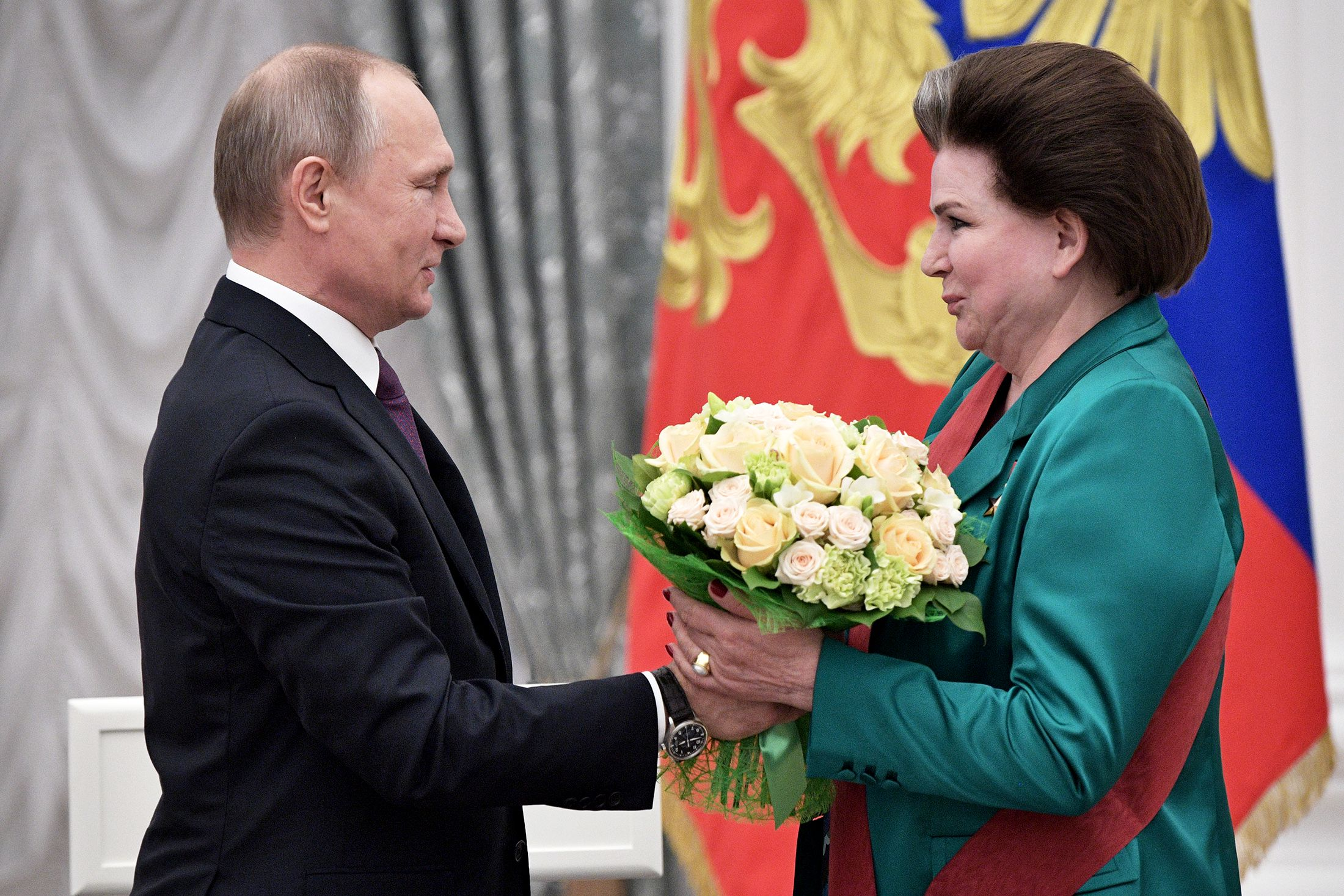
Russian President Vladimir Putin awarding to Order "For Merit to the Fatherland", 1st class, 24 May 2017

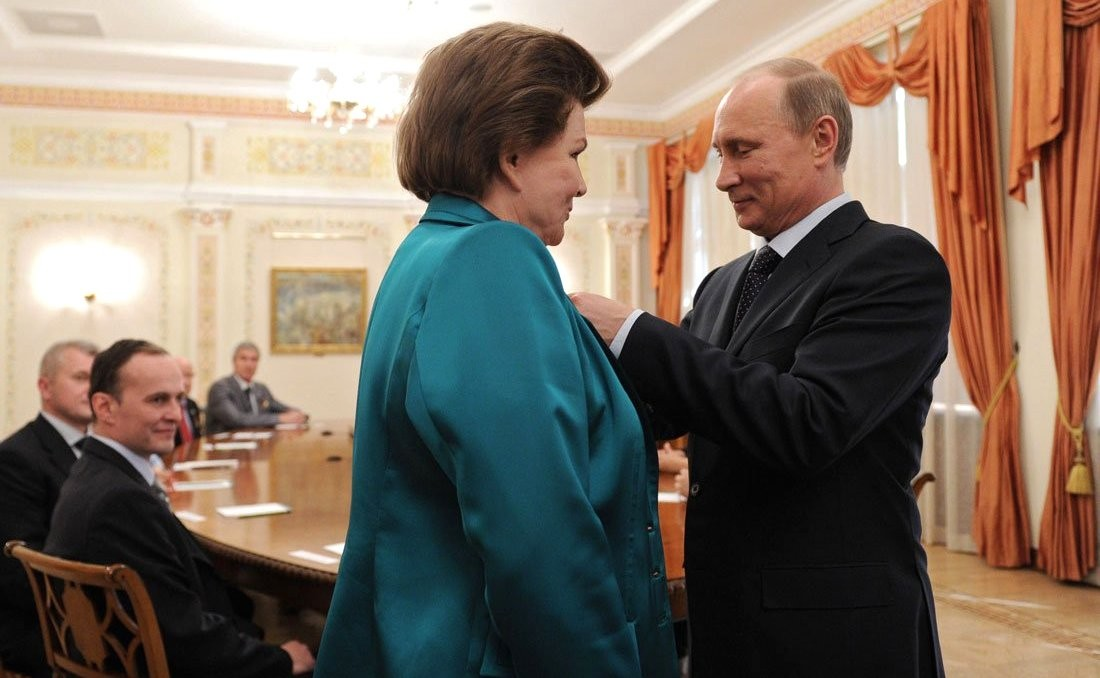
Russian President Vladimir Putin awarding to Order of Alexander Nevsky, 14 June 2013

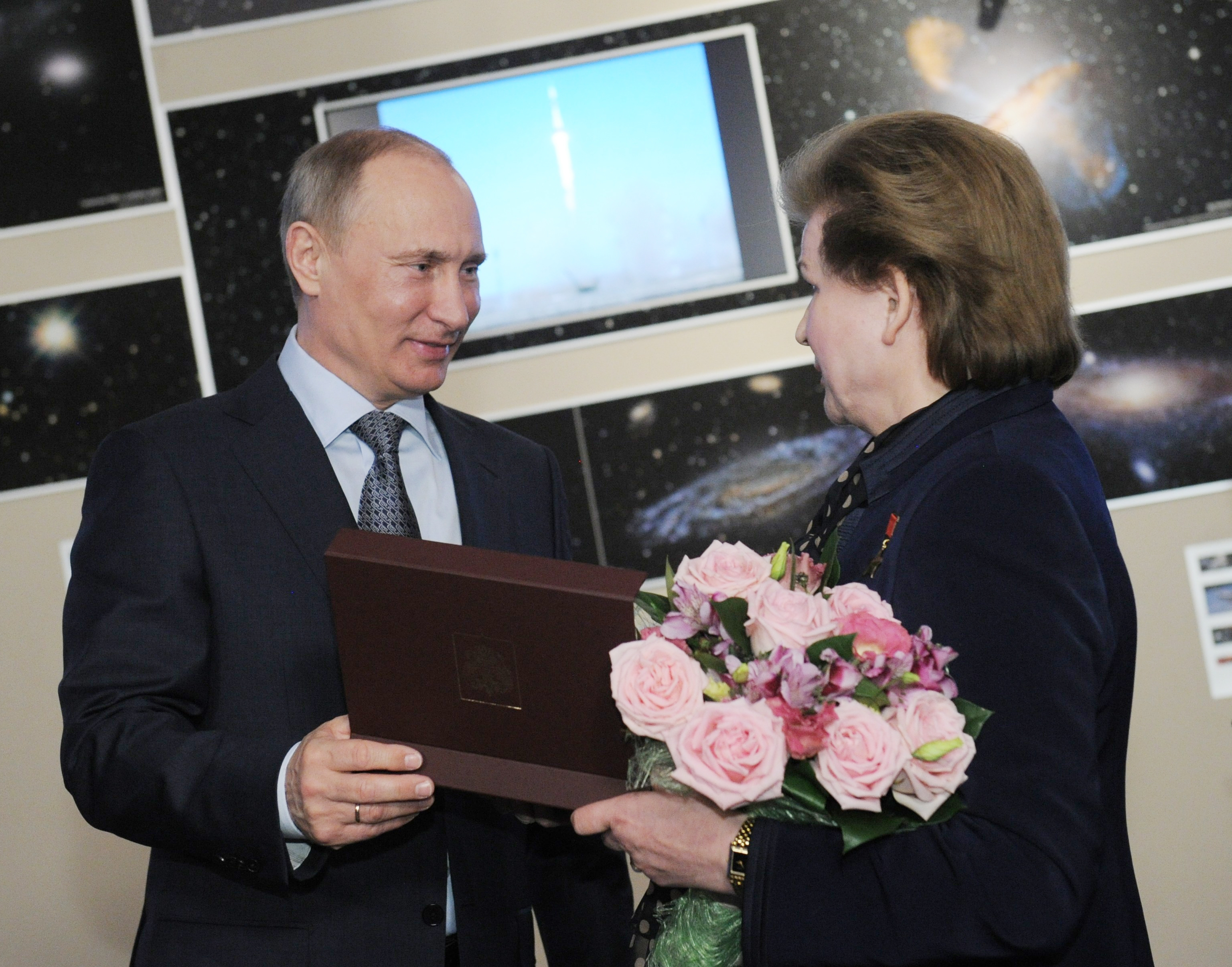
Russian Prime Minister Vladimir Putin awarding to Gagarin Government Prize, 12 April 2012

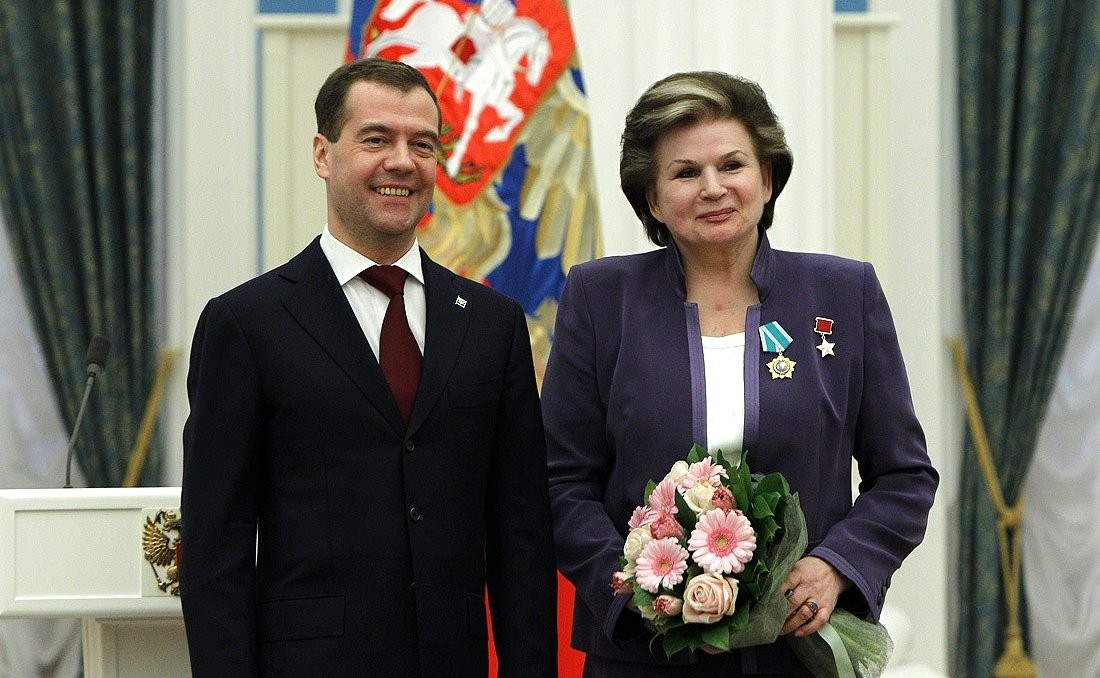
Russian President Dmitry Medvedev awarding to Order of Friendship, 12 April 2011

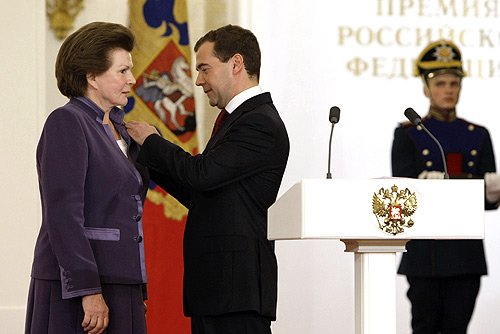
Russian President Dmitry Medvedev awarding to State Prize of the Russian Federation, 12 June 2009

- Order of Merit for the Fatherland:
  - 4th class (21 February 2022);
  - 3rd class (6 March 1997)
  - 2nd class (6 March 2007)
  - 1st class (1 March 2017)
- Order of Alexander Nevsky (12 June 2013)
- Order of Honour (10 June 2003)
- Order of Friendship (12 April 2011)
- Russian Federation State Prize for outstanding achievements in the field of humanitarian action in 2008 (4 June 2009)
- Participant of the Military Operation in Syria Medal (2016)
- Order of Gagarin (2023)
- Strengthening the Military Community Medal (2018)
- Certificates of appreciation from the Government of the Russian Federation;
  - 3 March 1997 – for the contribution to the development of space, the strengthening of international scientific and cultural ties and years of diligent work
  - 12 June 2003 – for large contribution to the development of crewed space flight
  - 16 June 2008 – for long-term fruitful state and public activities, considerable personal contribution to the development of crewed space flight and in connection with the 45th anniversary of spaceflight
- Order of St. Euphrosyne of Moscow (January 2008)

=== Soviet ===
- Merited Master of Sports of the Soviet Union (June 1963)
- Hero of the Soviet Union (1963)
- Order of Lenin (1963, 1981)
- Order of the October Revolution (1971)
- Order of the Red Banner of Labour (1987)
- Order of the Friendship of Peoples
- Pilot-Cosmonaut of the Soviet Union (1963)

=== Other decorations and honours ===
- Gold star Hero of Socialist Labor (Czechoslovakia, August 1963)
- Gold star Hero of Socialist Labor (Bulgaria) (9 September 1963)
- Order of Georgi Dimitrov (Bulgaria, 9 September 1963)
- Order of Karl Marx (East Germany, October 1963)
- Artur Becker Medal (East Germany, October 1963)
- Order of the Cross of Grunwald, 1st class (Poland, October 1963)
- Order of the Flag of the Republic of Hungary, 1st class (April 1965)
- First Class of Order of Tri Shakti Patta (Nepal, 1963)
- Star of the Republic of Indonesia, 2nd class (November 1963)
- Order of the Volta (Ghana, January 1964)
- Gold Star Medal of the Hero of the Mongolian People's Republic (May 1965)
- Order of Sukhbaatar (Mongolia, May 1965)
- Order of the Enlightenment (Afghanistan, August 1969)
- Order of Planets (Jordan, December 1969)
- Order of the Nile (Egypt, January 1971)
- Gold Star of Hero of Labor (Vietnam, October 1971)
- Order of Bernardo O'Higgins (Chile, March 1972)
- Order of Ana Betancourt (Cuba, 1974)
- Order of Friendship (Laos, 1997)
- Order of Duke Branimir, with sash (Croatia, presented on 8 September 2005)
- She received the Eduard Rhein Ring of Honor from the German Eduard Rhein Foundation in 2007.
- Gold Medal of the British Society for interplanetary communications "For achievements in space exploration" (February 1964)
- Gold Space Medal (FAI, 1963)
- Honorary doctorate from the University of Edinburgh (1990)

== Legacy ==
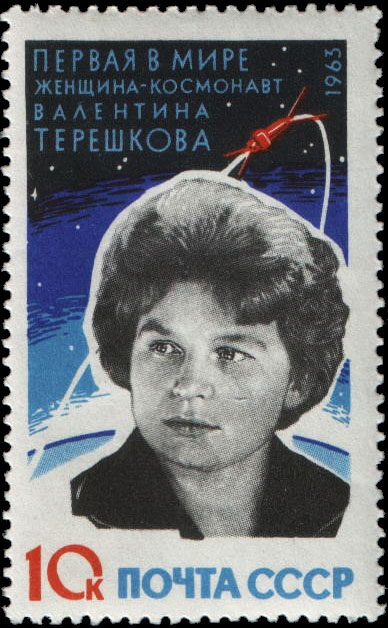
1963 Russian postage stamp

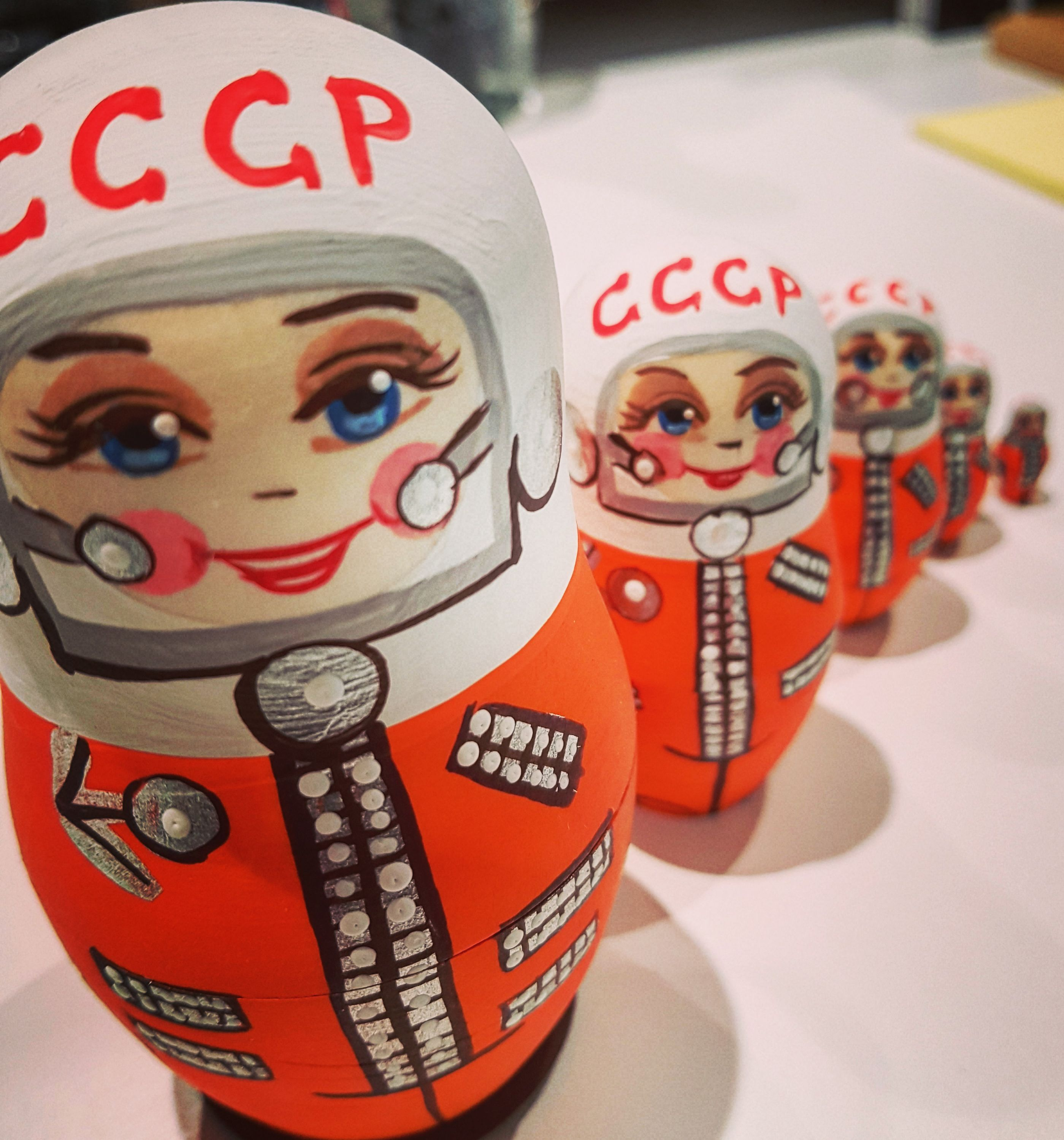
Soviet-era matryoshka doll celebrating Tereshkova.

Numerous objects and places were named after Tereshkova in the USSR and Russia. Novopromyshna Square in Tver was renamed Tereshkova Square in 1963.

In 1967, Gregory Postnikov created a sculpture of Tereshkova for Cosmonaut Alley in Moscow. There is a monument in Bayevsky District of Altai Territory, Siberia, close to her landing site. In August 1970, Tereshkova was among the first group of living people to have a lunar crater named after them. Tereshkova crater is located on the far side of the Moon.

Fashion designer Pierre Cardin was inspired to create his Space Age styles after visiting the Soviet Union in 1963 and seeing photos of Tereshkova in her spacesuit and helmet.

In 2003 Tereshkova was portrayed by Apollonia Vanova in a 2003 made-for-TV movie of Madeleine L'Engle's A Wrinkle in Time.

In 1997, London-based electronic pop group Komputer released a song entitled "Valentina" which describes her career as a cosmonaut. It was released as a single and appears on their album The World of Tomorrow. The 2000 album Vostok 6 by Kurt Swinghammer is a concept album about Tereshkova. The 2015 album The Race for Space by Public Service Broadcasting (feat. Smoke Fairies) included a track entitled "Valentina". In the same year, Findlay Napier's album VIP: Very Interesting Persons included a song "Valentina", written in her honour by Napier and Boo Hewerdine. In 2015, a short film entitled Valentina's Dream was released by Meat Bingo Productions. The film stars Rebecca Front as Tereshkova and is based on an interview by the former cosmonaut where she expressed a desire to journey to Mars.

The Cosmos Museum was opened on 25 January 1975 near Yaroslavl. Among its exhibits is a replica of her childhood home. The city library was named after her in 2013. The school she attended as a child was renamed for her. A planetarium in Yaroslavl was built and named for her in 2011. The International Women of the Year association named her as the "greatest woman achiever of the 20th century". Tereshkova was a torchbearer of the 2008 Summer Olympics torch relay in Saint Petersburg and the 2014 Winter Olympics torch relay in Sochi.

Streets in Ukraine that bore Tereshkova's name have been renamed due to her support of Russia's military actions against Ukraine and in accordance with the country's 2015 decommunisation law. A proposal was also brought forward in 2015 to move a monument to Tereshkova in Lviv, Ukraine to the Territory of Communist Terror Memorial Museum. Monuments of communist leaders are removed from the public and placed in the museum as part of decommunization efforts. In January 2021, 24 Ukrainian streets were still named after Tereshkova; including a street in Busk, located in the same province as Lviv. As of 2023, these streets have acquired new names, and there are no more objects named after Tereshkova in Ukraine. The monument to Tereshkova in Lviv was dismantled in November 2023 and transferred to the Museum of Totalitarian Regimes.

== See also ==
- List of female spacefarers
- List of female Heroes of the Soviet Union
