= Stearns (surname) =

Stearns is a surname derived from the Old English Stierne, which meant severe or strict. Variations include Stearn, Sterne and Stern. Notable people and characters with the name include:

== People ==
- Asahel Stearns (1774–1839), American politician from Massachusetts
- Betsey Ann Stearns (1830–1914), American inventor
- Bill Stearns (1853–1898), American professional baseball pitcher
- Carl Leo Stearns (1892–1972), American astronomer
- Cassius Clement Stearns (1838–1910), American composer
- Charles Woodward Stearns (1817–1887), American writer
- Charles Thomas Stearns (1807–1898), American politician from Illinois and Minnesota
- Charlotte Champe Stearns (1843–1929), American social worker, poet and mother of T. S. Eliot
- Cheryl Stearns (born 1955), American skydiver
- Clark Daniel Stearns (1870–1944), American naval officer and Governor of American Samoa
- Cliff Stearns (born 1941), American politician from Florida
- David Stearns (born 1985), American baseball executive
- Eben S. Stearns (1819–1887), American educator
- Foster W. Stearns (1881–1956), American politician from New Hampshire
- Frances Stearns (1907–2001), American politician from Connecticut
- Frank Stearns (1856–1939), American businessman and close friend of Calvin Coolidge
- Frank Preston Stearns (1846–1917), American writer and abolitionist from Massachusetts
- Frederick K. Stearns (1854–1924), American businessman (see also Frederick Stearns Building)
- George Luther Stearns (1809–1867), American industrialist and merchant
- George Stearns (politician) (1901–1979), Canadian politician from Quebec
- Glenn Stearns (born 1963), American businessman, founder of Stearns Lending
- Guy Beckley Stearns (1870–1947), American physician specializing in homeopathy
- Henry A. Stearns (1825–1910), American politician and industrialist from Rhode Island
- Howard Stearns (born 1955), American college football coach
- Jason Stearns (born 1976), American writer, coordinator of a UN investigation into the wars in the Democratic Republic of the Congo
- Jeff Chiba Stearns (fl. 2000s–present), Canadian independent animation filmmaker
- John Stearns (1951–2022), American professional baseball player
- John Stearns (physician) (1770–1848), American physician
- John Goddard Stearns Jr. (1843–1917), American architect and co-founder of the firm Peabody & Stearns
- Junius Brutus Stearns (1810–1885), American painter
- Justin K. Stearns (born 1974), American academic
- Katee Stearns, American model who served as Miss Maine USA
- Marcellus Stearns (1839–1891), American politician from Florida
- Marshall Stearns (1908–1966), American jazz critic and musicologist
- Martha Stearns Marshall (1726–1771), American Separate Baptist preacher
- Michael Stearns (born 1948), American ambient musician
- Nellie George Stearns (1855–1936), American artist and art teacher
- Onslow Stearns (1810–1878), American railroad builder and executive
- Ozora P. Stearns (1831–1896), American politician from Minnesota
- Peter Stearns (born 1936), American history professor
- Peyton Stearns (born 2001), American tennis player
- R. H. Stearns (1824–1909), American tradesman, philanthropist, and politician from Massachusetts
- Richard Stearns (disambiguation), several people
  - Richard Stearns (sailor) (1927–2022), American sailor and Olympic medalist
  - Richard Stearns (World Vision), American charity executive
  - Richard E. Stearns (1936–2026), American computer scientist
  - Richard G. Stearns (born 1944), American federal judge from Massachusetts
- Robert B. Stearns, American financier and co-founder of Bear Stearns
- Robert Edwards Carter Stearns (1827–1909), American conchologist
- Shubal Stearns (1706–1771), American evangelist and preacher
- Stephen C. Stearns (born 1946), American evolutionary biology
- Tim Stearns (born 1961), American biologist
- Theodore Stearns (1880–1935), American composer
- Winfrid Alden Stearns (1852–1909), American naturalist

== Fictional characters ==
- Mike Stearns, a fictional character in 1632

== See also ==
- Sterns (surname)
- Stearn, surname
