= Stearnes =

Stearnes may refer to:

- Stearnes, Virginia, U.S., unincorporated community
- Turkey Stearnes (1901– 1979), American baseball player

== See also ==
- Stearne, given name and surname
- Stearns (disambiguation)
- Sterns (disambiguation)
