= Stern (disambiguation) =

The stern is the rear or aft part of a ship or boat.

Stern may also refer to:

== People ==
- Stern (given name)
- Stern (surname)
- Stern family, a Jewish French banking family
- Daniel Stern, pen name of Marie d'Agoult (1805–1876), author and paramour of Franz Liszt

== Schools ==
- Stern College for Women, an undergraduate women's college of Yeshiva University, located in Manhattan, New York
- Stern Conservatory, a former private music school in Berlin, now part of the Berlin University of the Arts
- New York University Stern School of Business

== Other uses ==
- Stern (magazine), a weekly German news magazine
- Stern Review, an influential report on global warming's economic effect
- Stern (game company), two related arcade gaming companies
- Stern baronets, two extinct titles in the Baronetage of the United Kingdom
- Stern Hall (disambiguation)
- Stern House, a reconstructed building in Jerusalem
- USS Stern, a World War II destroyer escort
- Stern (band), experimental music project led by Chuck Stern

== See also ==
- Lehi (group), underground Zionist organization informally known as the Stern Gang or Group
- Selim I, Sultan of the Ottoman Empire nicknamed Yavuz ("the Stern")
- Sterns (disambiguation)
