= Stearns =

Stearns may refer to:

== Places in the United States ==
- Stearns, Kentucky
- Stearns, Wisconsin
- Stearns County, Minnesota
- Stearns Scout Camp
- Stearns Wharf, Santa Barbara, California

== Others ==
- Stearns (automobile)
- Stearns (crater), a lunar crater named after Carl Leo Stearns
- Stearns (surname)
- 2035 Stearns, an asteroid named after Carl Leo Stearns

== See also ==
- Stearnes (disambiguation)
- Sterns (disambiguation)
