= Stearn =

Stearn is a surname derived from the Old English Stearne, which means severe or strict. Variations include Stearns, Sterne and Stern. It may refer to the following:

- Christopher Stearn (born 1980), English cricketer
- Jess Stearn (1914–2002), Jewish-American journalist and author
- Thomas Stearn (1796–1862), English cricketer
- William T. Stearn (1911–2001), British botanist

== See also ==
- Stern (surname)
- Stearne, given name and surname
- Stearns (surname)
