= Barbara Stern Burstin =

American historian

- Born: Barbara Stern
- Education: Vassar College
- Occupations: Historian, Author, Professor
- Children: 4
- Writing career
- Genres: Holocaust; Pittsburgh Jewish history
- Notable works: After the Holocaust: The Migration of Polish Jews and Christians to Pittsburgh (May 1989); Steel City Jews 1840-1915 (vol 1) (Oct 24, 2008) "Steel City Jews in Prosperity, Depression and War 1915 - 1950 (vol 2) (2015)" "Pittsburgh Jews (2017)"
- Website: pittsburghjewishhistory.net

Barbara Stern Burstin is an adjunct professor in the history departments at the University of Pittsburgh and Carnegie Mellon University. She has published several books and articles relating to the Holocaust and the history of Jews in Pittsburgh.

== Early life and education ==
The daughter of Mildred and Joseph Stern, Burstin was raised in Farmingdale, New York. Aaron Stern, her grandfather, was one of the first Jews to settle in Farmingdale, and operated Stern's Pickle Factory. Burstin earned a bachelor's degree in economics from Vassar College, in Poughkeepsie, N.Y. in 1962 and went on to gain her master's in history education from Columbia University in 1963 prior to acquiring her doctorate in history from the University of Pittsburgh in 1986.

== Awards ==
In addition to awards from the Pittsburgh Chapter of the Zionist Organization of America, Burstin is a past recipient of the Sonia & Aaron Levinson Community Relations Award, the Solon J. Buck Award (1987), and the Oskar Halecki Prize from the Polish-American Historical Society (1991) and has been nominated for a regional Emmy Award for the film A Jewish Legacy (2000).

== Selected works ==
- After the Holocaust: The Migration of Polish Jews and Christians to Pittsburgh, University of Pittsburgh Press, 1989, 978–0822936039
- Steel City Jews, 978-09820633J09
- The Warsaw Ghetto: A Shattered Window on the Holocaust, in History Teacher, v13 n4 p531–41 Aug 1980.
- A Jewish Legacy (2000) (film)
- Steel City Jews: A history of the Pittsburgh Jewish community 1840-1915 (2015)
- Steel City Jews in Prosperity, Depression, and War: A history of the Pittsburgh Jewish community 1915-1950 (2015)
- Jewish Pittsburgh "Images of America Series" (2015)
