= Jenkins Bridge, Virginia =

Unincorporated community in Virginia, United States

- Unincorporated community
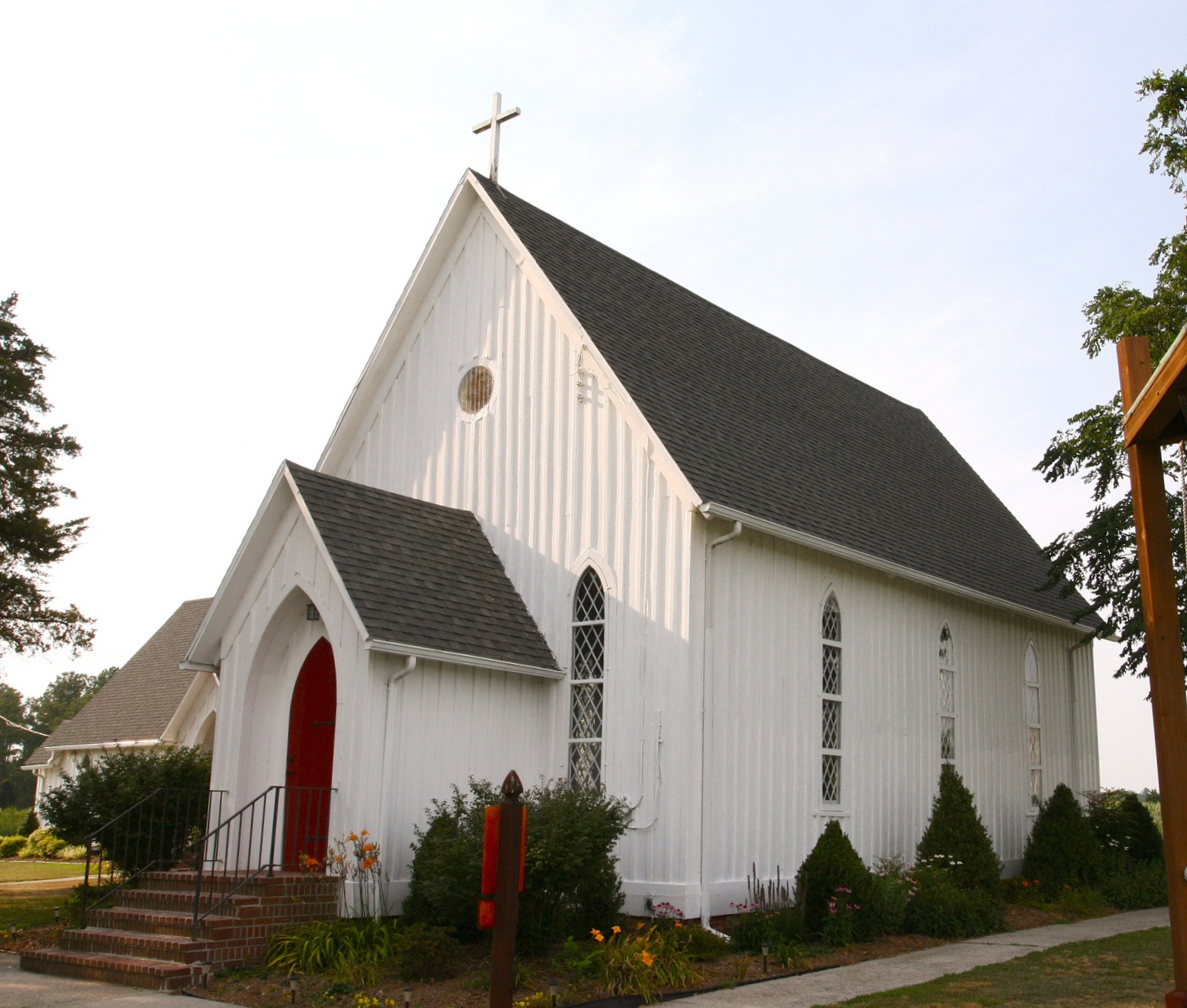
- Emmanuel Episcopal Church in Jenkins Bridge

- Location within Virginia Location within the United States
- Coordinates: 37°55′41″N 75°36′29″W
- Country: United States
- State: Virginia
- County: Accomack
- Elevation: 3 ft (0.91 m)
- Time zone: UTC-5 (Eastern (EST))
  - Summer (DST): UTC-4 (EDT)
- ZIP code: 23399
- Area codes: 757, 948
- GNIS feature ID: 1468667

Jenkins Bridge is an unincorporated community in Accomack County, Virginia, United States. Jenkins Bridge is located on Holdens Creek, 3.6 miles (5.8 km) north-northwest of Hallwood. Jenkins Bridge had a post office until January 20, 2007; it still has its own ZIP code, 23399.

== Emmanuel Church ==
At the center of Jenkins Bridge stands Emmanuel Episcopal Church, a well-preserved example of Carpenter Gothic architecture. Emmanuel Church was established in the 1850s as part of an effort to reinvigorate the Episcopal faith in the historic Accomack Parish which had largely ceased to function after the disestablishment of the Anglican Church following the American Revolution. The church was originally built in 1860 in the town of Temperanceville, Virginia (six miles east of the Jenkins Bridge). In 1887, Emmanuel was dismantled and moved to its present site in Jenkins Bridge. Emmanuel Church is considered the successor to the Assawoman Church, the original Accomack Parish Church which stood in the village of Assawoman in eastern Accomack County. Emmanuel Church preserves the silver chalice, dated 1749 and made in London, which originally belonged to the Assawoman Church. Bricks from the ruins of the Assawoman Church were also incorporated into the floor of Emmanuel's parish hall.
