= Sterns =

Sterns may refer to:

- Sterns (surname)
- Stern's, defunct U.S. department store chain
- Sterns Nightclub, defunct nightclub in Worthing, West Sussex, England
- Stern's Pickle Works, defunct pickle factory based in New York

== See also ==
- Stearns (disambiguation)
- Stern (disambiguation)
