= C/1927 E1 (Stearns) =

Parabolic comet

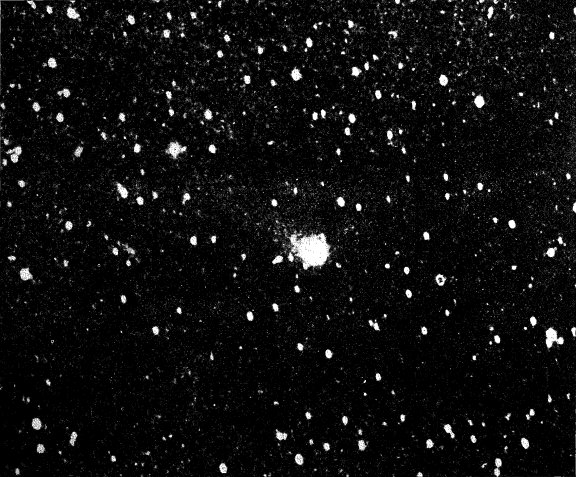
- Stearns' Comet photographed by George van Biesbroeck on 13 March 1927.

Discovery
- Discovered by: Carl Leo Stearns
- Discovery site: Van Vleck Observatory
- Discovery date: 10 March 1927

Designations
- Alternative designations: 1927 IV, 1927d

Orbital characteristics
- Epoch: 28 April 1927 (JD 2424998.5)
- Observation arc: 4.005 years
- Number of observations: 17
- Perihelion: 3.685 AU
- Eccentricity: 1.00127
- Inclination: 87.690°
- Longitude of ascending node: 215.66°
- Argument of periapsis: 11.068°
- Mean anomaly: 0.0002°
- Last perihelion: 22 March 1927
- T_{Jupiter}: 0.100
- Earth MOID: 2.693 AU
- Jupiter MOID: 1.728 AU
- Comet total magnitude (M1): 1.9
- Comet nuclear magnitude (M2): 7.5

Stearns' Comet, also known by its formal designation C/1927 E1, is a distant non-periodic comet that was observed from 1927 to 1931. It is the only comet discovered by Dr. Carl Leo Stearns.
