= Carl Stearns =

Carl Stearns may refer to:

- Carl Leo Stearns (1892–1972), American astronomer
- Carl Stearns Clancy (1890–1971), American motorcycle rider, film director and producer
