= Richard Stern =

Richard Stern may refer to:

- Richard Martin Stern (1915–2001), American novelist
- Richard G. Stern (1928–2013), American writer and educator in the field of literature
- Richard H. Stern (born 1931), American lawyer, writer, academic in the field of intellectual property
- Richard J. Stern (1913-2001), American financier and philanthropist
- Richard Stern, British former Vice-President of the World Bank; brother of Nicholas Stern, Baron Stern of Brentford
- Richard Stern, CEO of TuneIn, Inc.

== See also ==
- Richard Sterne (disambiguation)
- Richard Stearns (disambiguation)
