= Steno =

Steno may refer to:

- Steno, Salamis, a small community at the northwest of Salamis Island, Greece
- Stenography, the process of writing in shorthand
  - Stenotype, a specialized chorded keyboard or typewriter used by stenographers for shorthand use
  - Stenographer or Stenotypist or Steno, a specialized person for using a Stenotype machine
- Steno-typist, a combination of typist and stenographer
- Stenotrophomonas maltophilia (Steno), a bacterium which causes uncommon, but difficult to treat, infections in humans
- Steno (genus), the monotypic genus of the rough-toothed dolphin
- Steno Diabetes Center, a research and teaching hospital in Gentofte, Denmark

== Craters ==
- Steno (lunar crater)
- Steno (Martian crater)
- Steno-Apollo, a lunar crater originally named Steno

== People ==
- Michele Steno (1331 – 1413), Venetian statesman who served as the 63rd Doge of Venice
- Nicolas Steno (1638–1686), the latinised name of Niels Steensen (or Stensen), a pioneer in anatomy and geology
- Stefano Vanzina (a.k.a. Steno) (1915–1988), Italian movie director

== See also ==
- Sterno, a fuel made from jellied alcohol
