= Elijah Baker =

Elijah Baker may refer to:

- Elijah Baker (actor) (born 1991), an English actor, writer, and director
- Elijah Baker (preacher) (1742–1798), an American Baptist preacher
