= Frank Stearns =

American businessman

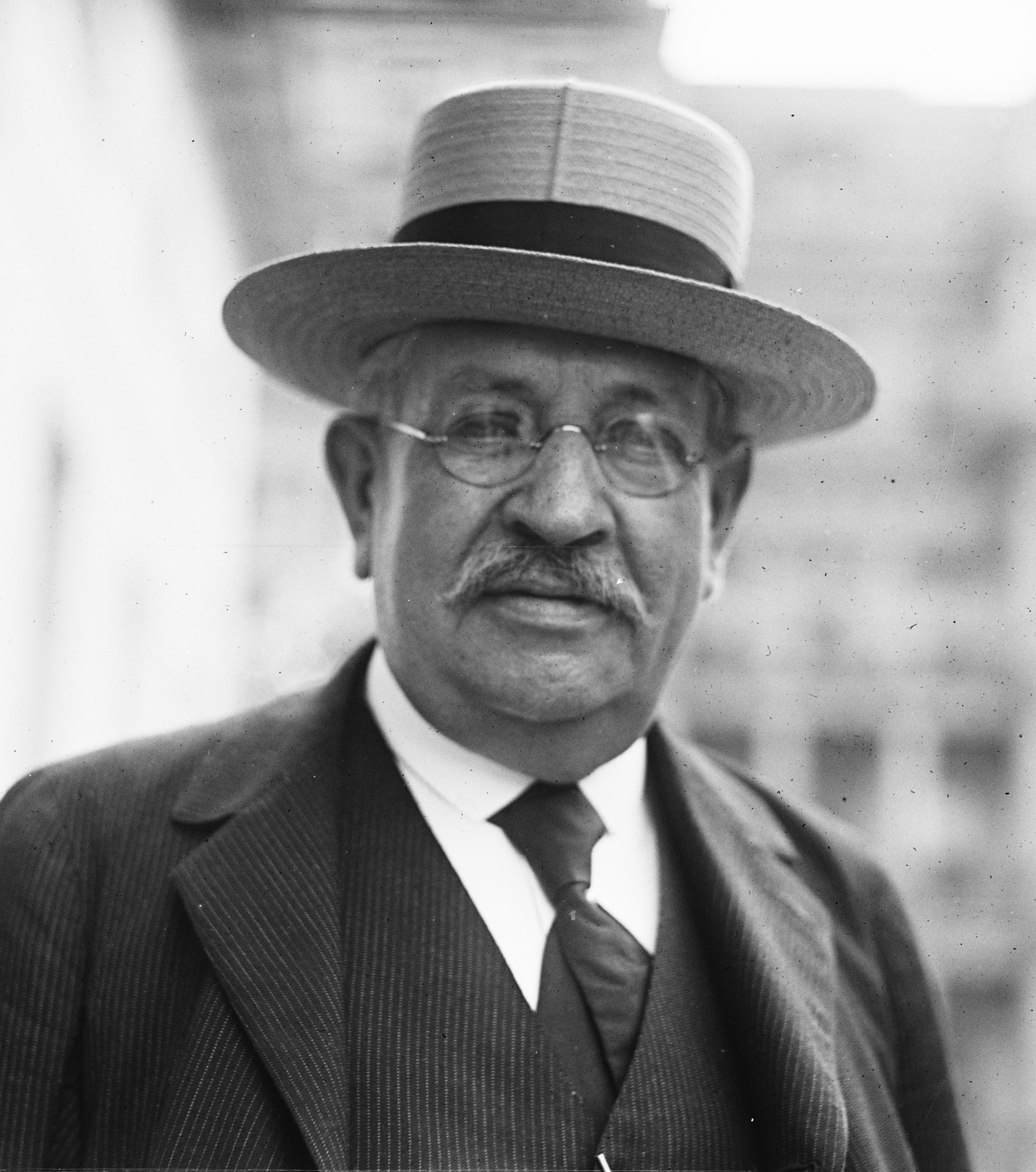
Frank W. Stearns in 1923

Frank Waterman Stearns (November 8, 1856 – March 6, 1939) was an American businessman whose father, Richard H. Stearns had founded the R. H. Stearns department store and company in Boston. His mother was Louise M. Waterman.

Stearns was born in Boston. After graduating from Amherst College in 1878, he joined his father's retail dry goods firm in Boston. He became a partner in that company in 1881 and was appointed chairman of its board of directors in 1919.

Stearns was an early supporter and close friend of his fellow Amherst College alumnus, Calvin Coolidge, whose political career, culminating in the presidency following the death of president Warren G. Harding in 1923, he championed.

In 1880 Stearns married Emily Williston Clark, daughter of Amherst College alumnus and later professor William S. Clark. Frank Stearns died in Boston on March 6, 1939.
