= Elizur Wright =

American abolitionist and actuary (1804–1885)

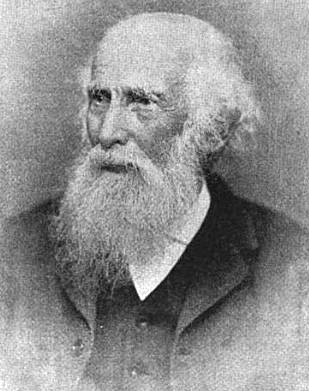
- Wright in 1883
- Born: Elizur Wright III; February 12, 1804; South Canaan, Connecticut, U.S.
- Died: November 22, 1885 (aged 81)
- Education: Yale College
- Occupations: Mathematician; abolitionist
- Known for: Advancements in life insurance and its regulation

Signature
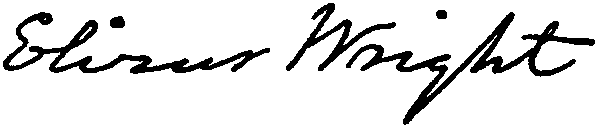

Elizur Wright III (12 February 1804 – 22 November 1885) was an American mathematician and abolitionist. He is sometimes described in the United States as "the father of life insurance", or "the father of insurance regulation", as he campaigned that life insurance companies must keep reserves and provide surrender values. Wright served as an insurance commissioner for the Commonwealth of Massachusetts.

== Early life ==
Wright was born in South Canaan, Connecticut, to a devout Christian family, who held anti-slavery beliefs and instilled in him a strict moral character. He was the first son of Elizur Wright (1762–1845), whose father was also named Elizur Wright, and his second wife Clarissa Richards (1771–1843). Wright was one of 10 children; six were half-siblings by his father's first wife. His father was a 1781 Phi Beta Kappa graduate of Yale College, and was known for his mathematical learning and devotion to the Calvinist faith. In 1810 the family moved to Tallmadge, Ohio, and the younger Elizur worked on the farm and attended an academy that was conducted by his father. The famous abolitionist John Brown attended the academy in Tallmadge with Elizur. His home served often as a refuge for fugitive slaves.

In 1826, the younger Wright graduated from Yale and began to teach: first for two years in Groton, Massachusetts, where he met and married Susan Clark, then at Hudson, Ohio, as a mathematics and natural philosophy (science) professor at Western Reserve College and Preparatory School (1829–1833), the first college in northern Ohio. It was during this time that Wright encountered the writings of William Lloyd Garrison. Garrison's small book, Thoughts on African Colonization, persuaded Wright that slavery should immediately be abolished, and that the American Colonization Society's effort to transport free blacks to an African colony was both unethical and impractical.

Garrison's pamphlet and his new newspaper, The Liberator, had other influence on Western Reserve College. In 1832, college pastor and professor of sacred literature (Bible) Beriah Green preached four abolitionist sermons clearly inspired by Garrison. The uproar this created, which was followed nationally, led to Green's resignation. Under pressure from conservative trustees, he left to become president of the Oneida Institute, where as a condition of his acceptance of the post, he was free to preach "immediatism", immediate abolition. The Oneida Institute focused on preparing future abolitionists, which Green felt was a moral and religious obligation.

The school's most distinguished professor, President Charles Backus Storrs, professor of theology, "bemoaned the fact that 'nothing is done in [the] college but discuss abolition and colonization'". He contracted tuberculosis, took a leave of absence, and died within six months.

This left Wright as one of two remaining professors, and it was an environment scarcely more hospitable for him than it had been for Green. The other professor, Rufus Nutting, professor of ancient languages and head of the library, was a colonizationist and cared little for abolitionism. Like Green, Wright wanted to accomplish more for the abolitionist cause than he could in Hudson.

== Abolitionist ==
Along with the brothers Lewis and Arthur Tappan, Beriah Green, Theodore Weld, James Birney, and other like-minded individuals, Wright founded the American Anti-Slavery Society at a convention in Philadelphia in December 1833, the year Wright had moved to New York City. Wright became the national secretary of the organization for five years. At this time, the American Anti-Slavery Society espoused the immediate abolition of slavery, and called for an end to racial prejudice and equality for all. To effect this change, members practiced a policy of "moral suasion," an appeal to people's ethics in an attempt to get them to embrace abolitionism and renounce slavery as sinful.

Wright edited a large number of publications, including Human Rights (1834–1835), The Emancipator and the Quarterly Anti-Slavery Magazine (1835–1838). His continued opposition to slavery incurred the enmity of its advocates, his house was once besieged by a mob, and an attempt was made to kidnap him and convey him to North Carolina. In 1838, he moved to Boston, where he became editor of the Massachusetts Abolitionist in April 1839. In 1846 he established the Chronotype newspaper, which he conducted until it was absorbed by the Commonwealth (1850), of which also he was for a time the editor.

He was also involved in "The Great Postal Campaign" – a project whose job was to distribute abolitionist material across the country. The Anti-Slavery Society was successful in recruiting agents throughout the country to spread their message, but when Garrison and others began to broaden the scope of the Society to include women's rights and took on an anti-religion, anti-government tone, Wright and others objected and began to split from the Society in 1840.

Wright became involved with the newly created Liberty Party and began to separate from the evangelists and the religious anti-slavery movements, believing that government intervention was the way to abolition. Wright was a member of the Boston Vigilance Committee, an organization that assisted fugitive slaves. He was arrested and charged for aiding in the 1851 escape of Shadrach Minkins, the first black man to be seized in New England under the Fugitive Slave Act. He was not convicted. Wright was also indicted and tried for libel in consequence of his severe words for the liquor interests while publishing the Chronotype.

Wright eventually became estranged from the abolitionist movement. Moreover, due partially to disappointment in his church's lack of support for the abolitionist cause, and to a slowly growing desire to find secular solutions to social problems, the formerly pious and devout Congregationalist distanced himself from the church. Eventually, Wright became an atheist.

== Inventions ==
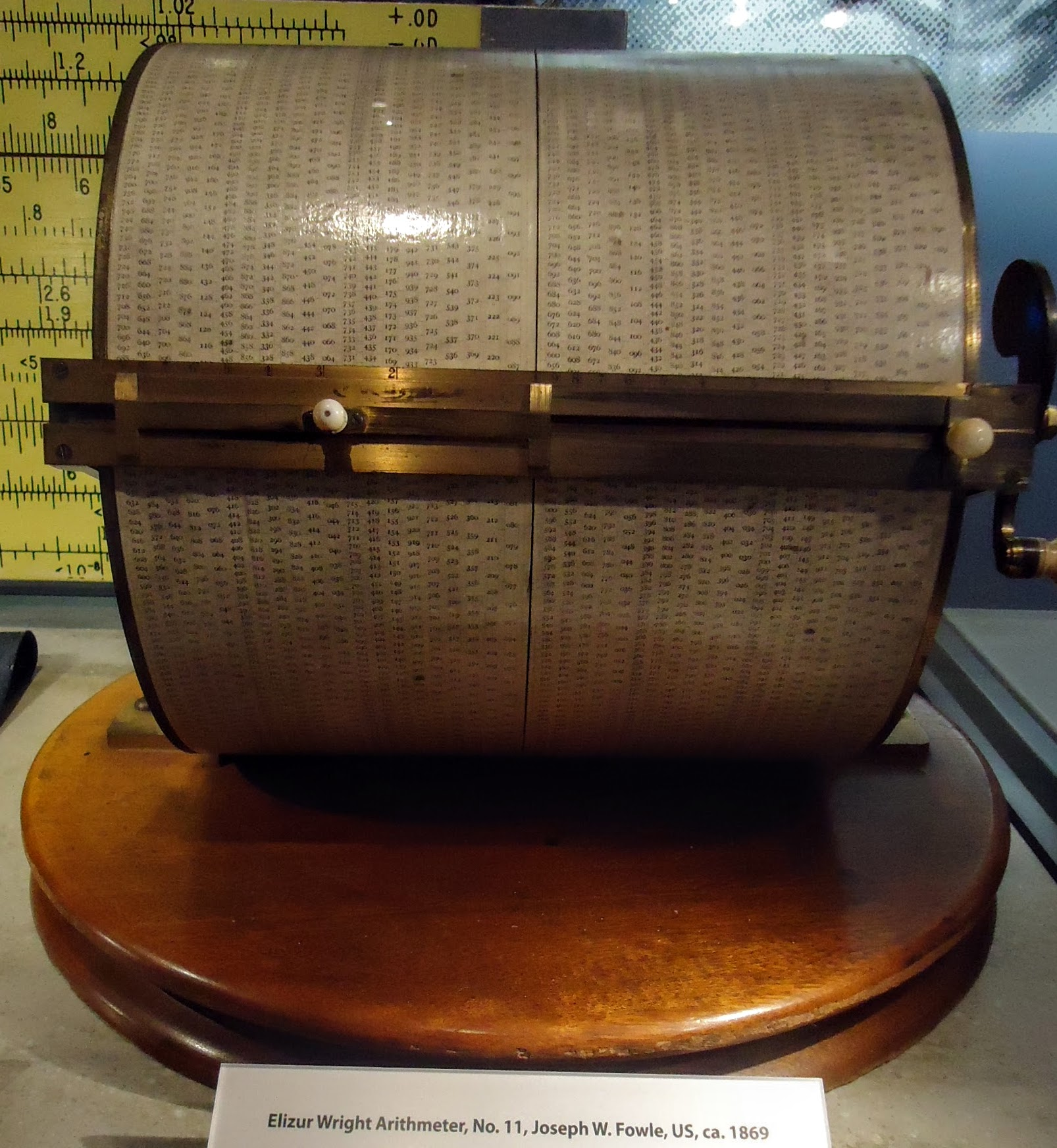
The Arithmeter, a high resolution cylindrical slide rule invented by Wright and patented in 1869. He sold it to insurance companies for $500.00, though only about 20 were made.

Between 1853 and 1858, besides editing the Railroad Times, he gave his attention to invention and mechanics, constructing a spike-making machine, a water faucet, and an improvement in pipe coupling. He patented the last two, and manufactured them for a short time.

== Life insurance ==
According to Frank Preston Stearns, Wright became interested in life insurance as a mathematical study and read "the best works on life insurance ... with the same ardor with which young ladies devour an exciting novel."

In the spring of 1852 an insurance broker placed an advertising booklet in his hand wherein Elizur Wright looked it over and perceived quickly enough that no company could undertake to do what this one pretended to and remain solvent. At age 40, Wright visited the Royal Exchange in London to investigate the life insurance industry. It was on this trip where he saw an advertisement in the Daily Telegraph for the Sale of 42 Old Life Insurance Policies in which old men were auctioning off their life insurance policies to investors after faithfully paying premiums all their lives. Elizur recognized that these life insurance policy owners were too old to work and could no longer afford their premium payments but were not yet dead to collect the benefit. As a result, the policy owners looked to speculators or investors. Wright recognized and wrote about the fact that life insurance policy owners were not able to obtain as much as half of the value that should be in these policies in his book Politics and Mysteries of Life Insurance.

To Wright, this was unconscionable, and upon his return to America, he began campaigning for a cleanup of the life insurance business, by requiring insurers to pay “surrender values” to policyholders on request and to hold adequate reserves to do so. Wright realized how easy it was to for insurance carriers to cheat, so he devised formulas for calculating the reserves and created statutory capital requirements for the industry. Ultimately, the life insurance industry accepted Wright's reforms. Wright served as an insurance commissioner for the State of Massachusetts from 1858 to 1866.

He devised a new formula for finding the values of policies of various terms, known as the “accumulation formula,” and, in order to facilitate his work, invented and afterward patented (1869) the “arithmeter,” a mechanical contrivance for multiplication and division, based on the logarithmic principle, a form of cylindrical slide rule.

== Public parks ==
Wright, a member of the Forestry Association, was instrumental in obtaining the Massachusetts Forestry Act of 1882. He initiated and promoted plans for making Middlesex Fells, an area north of Boston bordering Malden and Melrose, into a public park; although he did not succeed during his lifetime, the plan was carried out later and Middlesex Fells is Middlesex Fells Reservation to this day.

== Other activities ==
Wright served as an officer of the National Liberal League.

Along with his rationalist approach to insurance and religion, Wright was an ardent advocate of a phonetic writing system he called "phonotypy." A column written in this system appeared in almost every issue of his newspaper, the Chronotype (1846–1850).

== Writings ==
- La Fontaine, Fables (verse translation, 2 vols. 8vo, Boston, 1841; 2nd ed., New York, 1859)
- John Greenleaf Whittier, Ballads, and other Poems (introduction, London, 1844)
- A Curiosity of Law (1866)
- Savings Banks Life Insurance (1872)
- The Politics and Mysteries of Life Insurance (1873)
- Myron Holley, and what he did for Liberty and True Religion (1882)

In addition, he wrote many pamphlets and reports.
