= R. H. Stearns and Company =

Former department store in Boston, Massachusetts

Coordinates: 42.3556°N 71.0624°W

R. H. Stearns & Company, commonly called Stearns, was an upper-middle market department store based in Boston, Massachusetts, United States. It was founded by R. H. Stearns in 1847.

The flagship store—called the R. H. Stearns Building from 1909—was located on Tremont Street, opposite Boston Common, a few blocks away from its primary competitors on Washington Street, Filene's and Jordan Marsh.

Stearns carved out a niche as being more service-oriented than its competitors, and it was considered by some to be the "carriage trade" store of the Boston area. By the mid-1970s the changing face of the retail marketplace caught up with the store, and it did not have the financial backing of Filene's or Jordan Marsh, which were both owned by large national retail holding companies. At the time of Stearns's demise, Filene's was owned by Federated Department Stores, and Jordan Marsh was owned by Allied Stores.

== History ==
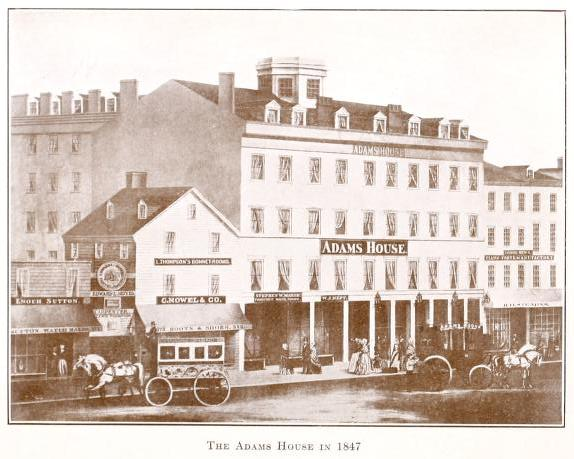
Adams House, 1847. R. H. Stearns' first shop is the first door to the north (right).

In 1847, Richard H. Stearns opened a one-room shop at 369 Washington Street, next to the Adams House, where he sold yard goods, whalebone and thread. Over the next twenty-five years he relocated the business several times, never more than a few blocks from where he had started. In 1885, Stearns made plans for a bigger move.

The Boston Masonic Temple, built in 1830 on the site of the Washington Gardens at the corner of Tremont Street and Turnagain Alley (which became Temple Place), was sold to the United States government in 1858 for use as a federal courthouse. The building was sold at auction in 1885 to the estate of William Fletcher Weld, which immediately leased it to R. H. Stearns and Co.

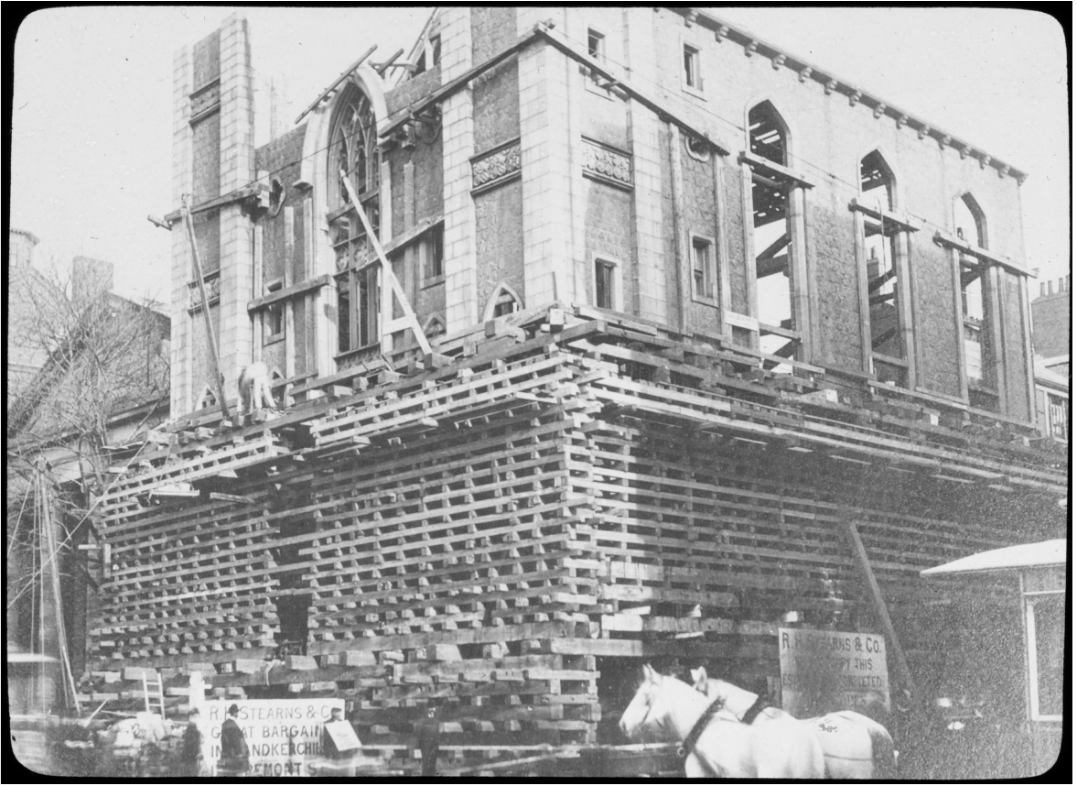
Masonic Temple undergoing conversion to a commercial space for R. H. Stearns, 1885

Stearns embarked on an ambitious remodeling project that involved raising the temple walls and inserting two stories of iron and glass underneath.

When it opened on June 2, 1886, the department store occupied the basement and first two floors; the upper floors, with a separate entrance at 10 Temple Place, were rented to small businesses.

The new store was well received, as reported by the Boston Evening Transcript.

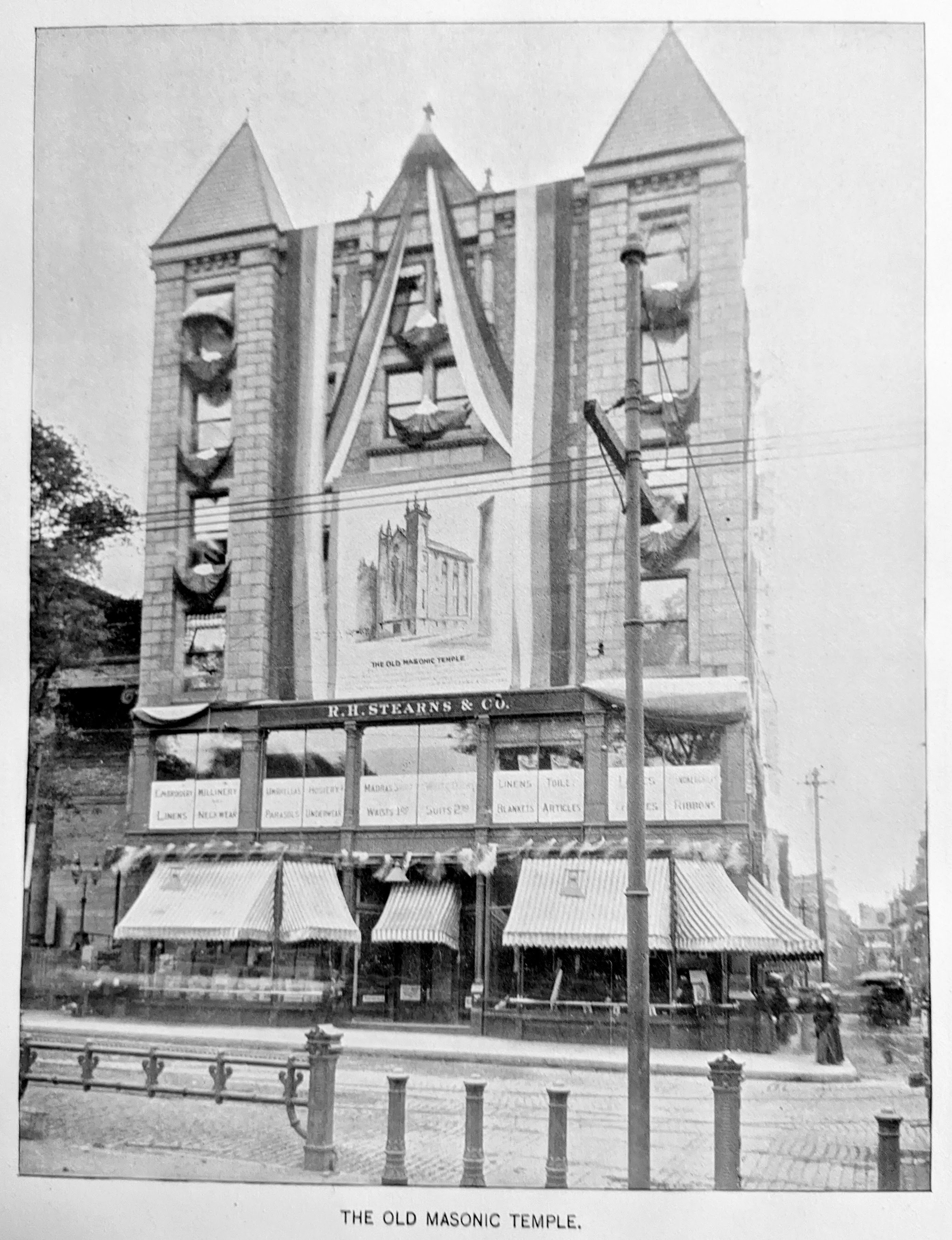
R. H. Stearns store decorated for the Knights Templar Conclave held in Boston, August, 1895.

One thing that must be noticed by every visitor is the remarkable supply of light obtained, for as light is received from all four sides of the building there is scarcely a dark corner in the store, even the basement presenting a bright and cheery appearance. The store is furnished in ash, the counters having cherry tops, and every department is connected with the cashier's desk by means of the Lamson cash railway. The store is lighted exclusively by electric light—both arc and incandescent,—the Thomson-Houston system being used.

The sales inventory had expanded beyond whalebone and thread. In 1886 the store stocked fans and fancy goods, stationery, laces and handkerchiefs, dress trimmings, buttons, sewing supplies, parasols, bustles and corsets, shawls, infants' clothing, supplies for art embroidery and upholstery, baskets, and "medium and high grade household goods"—linens, blankets and quilts.

Eventually, the business needed more space, but the current location was advantageous—in the city's main retail district, across from the Park Street subway station, with street cars running on both Tremont Street and Temple Place. In 1908 Stearns decided to raze the old remodeled temple and construct a new eleven-story emporium designed by the Boston firm Parker, Thomas & Rice.

== Bankruptcy and closure ==
R. H. Stearns & Company filed for Chapter 11 bankruptcy protection on March 28, 1977. The flagship store on Tremont Street closed on May 28, 1977, followed by closures of the five suburban branches over the next three months. On September 1, 1977, the South Shore Plaza branch was the last to close.

== Sources ==
- Watkins, Walter K. (1915). "An Historic Corner". In Rossiter, William S. (ed.). Days and Ways in Old Boston. Boston: R. H. Stearns and Company.
