= Richard Sterne =

Richard Sterne may refer to:

- Richard Sterne (bishop) (c. 1596–1683), Archbishop of York
- Richard Sterne (golfer) (born 1981), South African golfer

== See also ==
- Richard Stern (disambiguation)
- Richard Stearns (disambiguation)
