= 2035 Stearns =

Mars-crossing asteroid

Discovery
- Discovered by: J. B. Gibson
- Discovery site: El Leoncito Complex
- Discovery date: 21 September 1973

Designations
- Named after: Carl Leo Stearns (American astronomer)
- Alternative designations: 1973 SC · 1973 UG
- Minor planet category: Mars-crosser; Hungaria

Orbital characteristics
- Epoch 23 March 2018 (JD 2458200.5)
- Uncertainty parameter 0
- Observation arc: 44.35 yr (16,199 d)
- Aphelion: 2.1317 AU
- Perihelion: 1.6366 AU
- Semi-major axis: 1.8841 AU
- Eccentricity: 0.1314
- Orbital period (sidereal): 2.59 yr (945 d)
- Mean anomaly: 134.07°
- Mean motion: 0° 22^{m} 51.96^{s} / day
- Inclination: 27.751°
- Longitude of ascending node: 77.035°
- Argument of perihelion: 200.71°
- Earth MOID: 0.6305 AU (245 LD)
- Mars MOID: 0.1655 AU

Physical characteristics
- Mean diameter: 4.82±0.52 km 5.28 km (derived); 6.00±1.20 km
- Synodic rotation period: 51.89±0.20 h 85±0.1 h 93±1 h (Note: Lightcurve plot of (2035) Stearns with a rotation period 93±1 hours with a brightness amplitude of 0.20 mag. Taken by Robert Stephens at the Center for Solar System Studies (CS3) in 2014. Quality code is 2+. Summary figures at the LCDB.)
- Geometric albedo: 0.40 (assumed); 0.443±0.177; 0.65±0.30
- Spectral type: Tholen = E SMASS = Xe; B–V = 0.737; U–B = 0.280; V–R = 0.440
- Absolute magnitude (H): 12.61; 13.0

2035 Stearns, provisional designation 1973 SC, is a bright Hungaria asteroid and sizable Mars-crosser inside the inner regions of the asteroid belt, approximately 6 kilometers (3.7 miles) in diameter. It was discovered on 21 September 1973, by American astronomer James Gibson at the Leoncito Astronomical Complex in Argentina. The transitional E-type asteroid has a long rotation period of 93 hours. It was named after American astronomer Carl Leo Stearns.

== Orbit and classification ==
Stearns is a dynamical Hungaria asteroid, a large group that forms the innermost dense concentration of asteroids in the Solar System. It is also a Mars-crossing asteroid, a member of the dynamically unstable group, located between the main belt and near-Earth populations, and crossing the orbit of Mars at 1.666 AU.

The asteroid orbits the Sun in the inner main-belt at a distance of 1.64–2.13 AU once every 2 years and 7 months (945 days; semi-major axis of 1.88 AU). Its orbit has an eccentricity of 0.13 and an inclination of 28° with respect to the ecliptic.

The body's observation arc begins with a precovery taken at Palomar Observatory in January 1954, nearly 20 years prior to its official discovery observation at Leoncito.

== Physical characteristics ==
In the Tholen classification, Stearns is a bright E-type asteroid. while in the SMASS classification and Bus-DeMeo taxonomy, it is an Xe-subtype that transitions from the X-type to the E-type.

=== Rotation period ===
Several rotational lightcurve of Stearns have been obtained from photometric observations since 1988. Analysis of the best-rated lightcurve by Robert Stephens at the Center for Solar System Studies (U81) gave a rotation period of 93 hours with a brightness amplitude of 0.20 magnitude (U=2+). This makes the asteroid as close slow rotator.

=== Diameter and albedo ===
According to the survey carried out by the NEOWISE mission of NASA's Wide-field Infrared Survey Explorer, Stearns measures between 4.82 and 6.00 kilometers in diameter and its surface has an albedo between 0.443 and 0.65. The Collaborative Asteroid Lightcurve Link assumes a standard albedo for members of the Hungaria family of 0.40, and derives a diameter of 5.28 kilometers based on an absolute magnitude of 13.0.

== Naming ==
This minor planet was named after Carl Leo Stearns (1892–1972), American astronomer at Wesleyan University and Van Vleck Observatory who measured a large number of stellar parallaxes. The official naming citation was published by the Minor Planet Center on 1 November 1978 (M.P.C. 4548). The lunar crater Stearns was also named in his honor.
