= Religion in early Virginia =

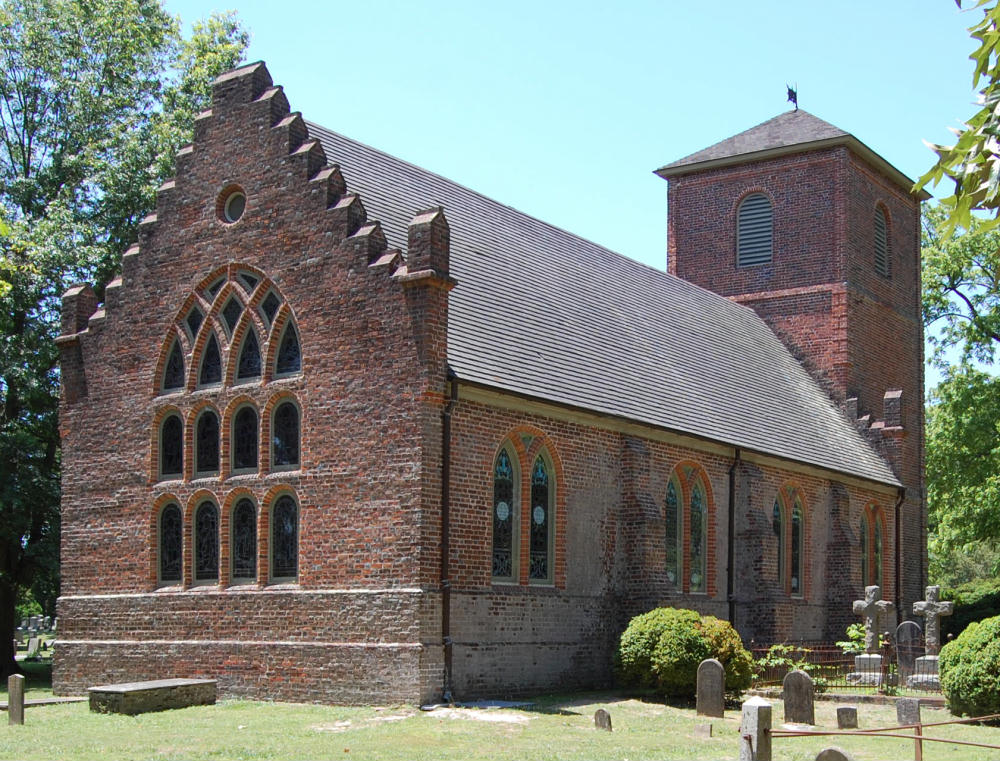
St. Luke's Church in Smithfield, built in the early- to mid-17th century, is the oldest extant brick church in the Thirteen colonies, and the only existing Gothic brick structure in the United States.

The history of religion in early Virginia begins with the founding of the Virginia Colony, in particular the commencing of Anglican services at Jamestown in 1607. In 1619, the Church of England was made the established church throughout the Colony of Virginia, becoming a dominant religious, cultural, and political force. Throughout the 18th century its power was increasingly challenged by Protestant dissenters and religious movements. Following the American Revolution and political independence from Britain, in 1786 the Virginia Statute for Religious Freedom disestablished the Church of England, ending public support and fully legalizing the public and private practice of other religious traditions.

== Background ==
After the start of the Columbian Exchange in 1492, subsequent waves of European colonization of the Americas coincided with the Protestant Reformation and Counter-Reformation. With the English Reformation beginning in the 1530s, England broke from the Roman Catholic Church to form the Church of England as its official religion (a status that was at dispute until the end of the 17th century). In turn, within England numerous groups of Protestants (collectively, the English Dissenters) broke from the Church of England for theological and liturgical reasons. The increasing hostility and disputes (often bloody) in Europe between and among Catholics and various groups of Protestants would influence and spill into the European colonization efforts, and in turn affect the internal relations among the colonists through the 17th and 18th centuries.

In 1570, a group of Spanish Jesuit missionaries founded the Ajacán Mission in what would become the Tidewater region of Virginia (its exact location uncertain). All but one of the missionaries were killed in 1571 by the indigenous populace. Subsequently, no Catholic churches would be founded in the future territory of Virginia until after the American Revolution. Despite this, archaeological discoveries of Catholic artifacts at the Jamestown site have led to speculation that at least a few of the early Jamestown settlers may have been crypto-Catholic.

== Arrival of Anglicanism ==
Anglicanism arrived in the Americas (and specifically what was then considered "Virginia") with the ill-fated Roanoke Colony (located in present-day North Carolina). Its brief existence saw recorded the first baptisms in North America into the Church of England.

Anglican chaplain Robert Hunt was among the first group of English colonists arriving in Virginia in 1607 (and among those dead by 1608). He was succeeded as chaplain by Richard Buck, who served in the post until his death in 1624. By the time the Virginia Company of London was dissolved in 1624, authorities in England had sent 22 Anglican clergymen to the colony.

=== Early missionaries ===
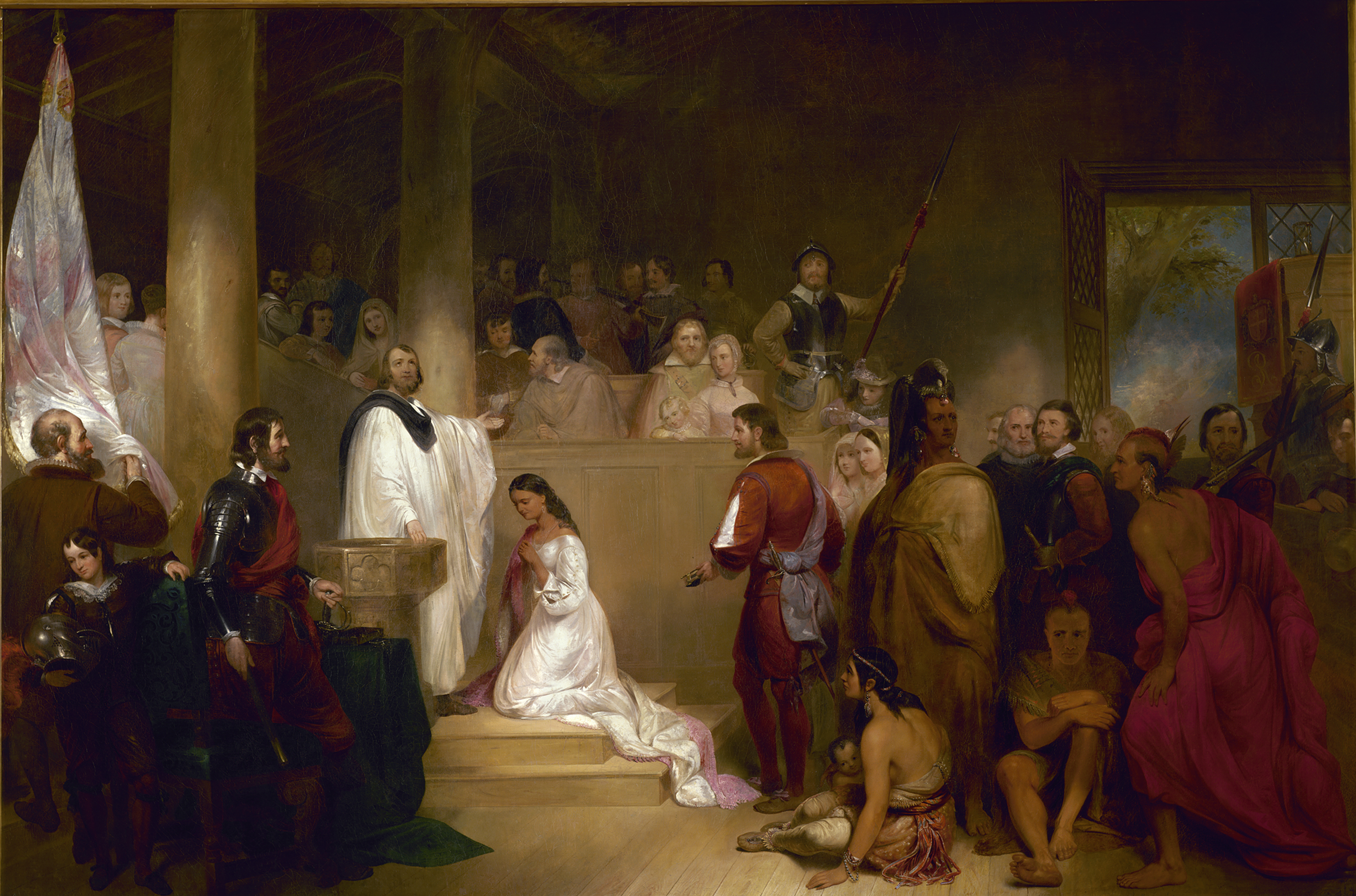
Baptism of Pocahontas by John Gadsby Chapman (1840)

Religious leaders in England felt they had a duty as missionaries to bring Christianity (or more specifically, the religious practices and beliefs of the Church of England, in contrast to the Latin incursion of Central and South America), to the Native Americans.

There was an assumption that their own "mistaken" spiritual beliefs were largely the result of a lack of education and literacy since the Powhatan did not have a need for a written language. Therefore, teaching them these skills would logically result in what the English saw as "enlightenment" in their religious practices, and bring them into the fold of the church. One of the earliest of these missionaries was Reverend Alexander Whitaker, who served from 1611 until his death in 1616. Efforts in the early 17th century to establish a school for the Virginia Indians at Henricus were abandoned following the Indian massacre of 1622 with the killing of a large number of the immigrant population by the Powhatan and subscent retaliations by the colonists, and would not come about for another century.

Apart from the Nansemond tribe, which had converted in 1638, and a few isolated individuals over the years, the other Powhatan tribes as a whole did not fully convert to Christianity until 1791.

== Established church ==
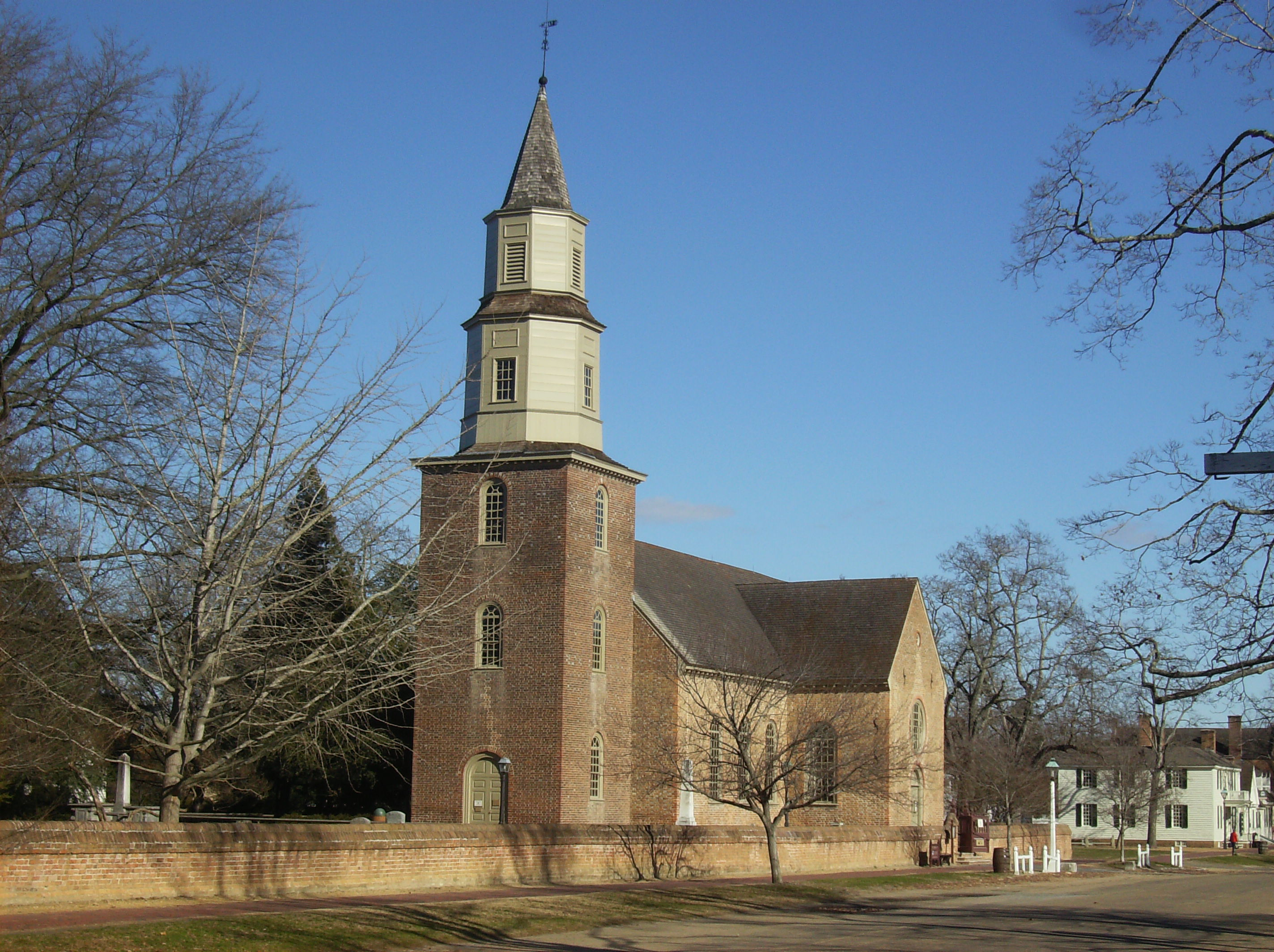
The Bruton Parish Church in Williamsburg, finished 1715. Government and college officials in the capital at Williamsburg were required to attend services at this Anglican church.

The Church of England was legally established in the colony in 1619. In practice, establishment meant that local taxes were funneled through the local parish to handle the needs of local government, such as roads and poor relief, in addition to the salary of the minister.

=== Anglican parishes ===
As in England, the parish became a unit of local importance, equal in power and practical aspects to other entities, such as the courts and even the House of Burgesses and the Governor's Council (the two houses of the Virginia General Assembly).

A typical parish contained three or four churches, as the parish churches needed to be close enough for people to travel to worship services, where attendance was expected of everyone. Expansion and subdivision of the church parishes followed population growth. The intention of the Virginia parish system was to place a church not more than six miles (10 km)-easy riding distance-from every home in the colony. Likewise the shires, soon after initial establishment in 1634 known as counties, were planned to be not more than a day's ride from all residents, so that court and other business could be attended to in a practical manner.

A parish was normally led spiritually by a rector and governed by a committee of layman members generally respected in the community, which was known as the vestry. There never was a bishop in colonial Virginia, and in practice, the local vestry controlled the parish. Indeed, there was fierce political opposition to having a bishop in the colony; the Anglican priests themselves were supervised directly by the Bishop of London. By the 1740s, the established Anglican church had about 70 parish priests around the colony.

Parishes typically had a church farm (or "glebe") to help support it financially. Each county court gave tax money to the local vestry. The vestry provided the priest a glebe of 200 or 300 acres (1.2 km^{2}), a house, and perhaps some livestock. The vestry paid him an annual salary of 16,000 pounds-of-tobacco, plus 1 pound (20 shillings) for every wedding and funeral. While not poor, the priests lived modestly and their opportunities for improvement were slim.

After a crop failure caused the price of tobacco to jump, the Two Penny Act was enacted by the General Assembly in 1758, allowing clergy to be paid instead at the rate of two pence per pound of tobacco owed them. The act was nullified by the government in Britain, angering some colonists and leading to a high-profile lawsuit by the clergy for back-pay, which became known as the Parson's Cause.

== Alternatives to the established church ==
Colonists were typically inattentive, uninterested, and bored during Anglican church services, according to the ministers, who complained that the people were sleeping, whispering, ogling the fashionably dressed women, walking about and coming and going, or at best looking out the windows or staring blankly into space. The lack of towns means the church had to serve scattered settlements, while the acute shortage of trained ministers meant that piety was hard to practice outside the home. Some ministers solved this problem by encouraging parishioners to become devout at home, using the Book of Common Prayer for private prayer and devotion. This allowed devout Anglicans to lead an active and sincere religious life apart from the unpopular formal church services. However the stress on private devotion weakened the need for a bishop or a large institutional church of the sort Blair wanted. The stress on personal piety opened the way for the First Great Awakening, which pulled people away from the established church.

The Act of Toleration 1689 (1 Will. & Mar. c. 18) had allowed freedom of worship for certain Nonconformist Protestant groups in England, with conditions and legal constraints. Similar tolerance was put in place in Virginia. Baptists, German Lutherans and Presbyterians, funded their own ministers, and favored disestablishment of the Anglican church. However, by the mid-18th century, Baptists and Presbyterians faced growing persecution; between 1768 and 1774, about half of the Baptist ministers in Virginia were jailed for preaching.

Especially in the back country, most families had no religious affiliation whatsoever and their low moral standards were shocking to proper Englishmen. The Baptists, Methodists, Presbyterians and other evangelicals directly challenged these lax moral standards and refused to tolerate them in their ranks. The evangelicals identified as sinful the traditional standards of masculinity which revolved around gambling, drinking, and brawling, and arbitrary control over women, children, and slaves. The religious communities enforced new standards, creating a new male leadership role that followed Christian principles and became dominant in the 19th century.

=== Presbyterians ===
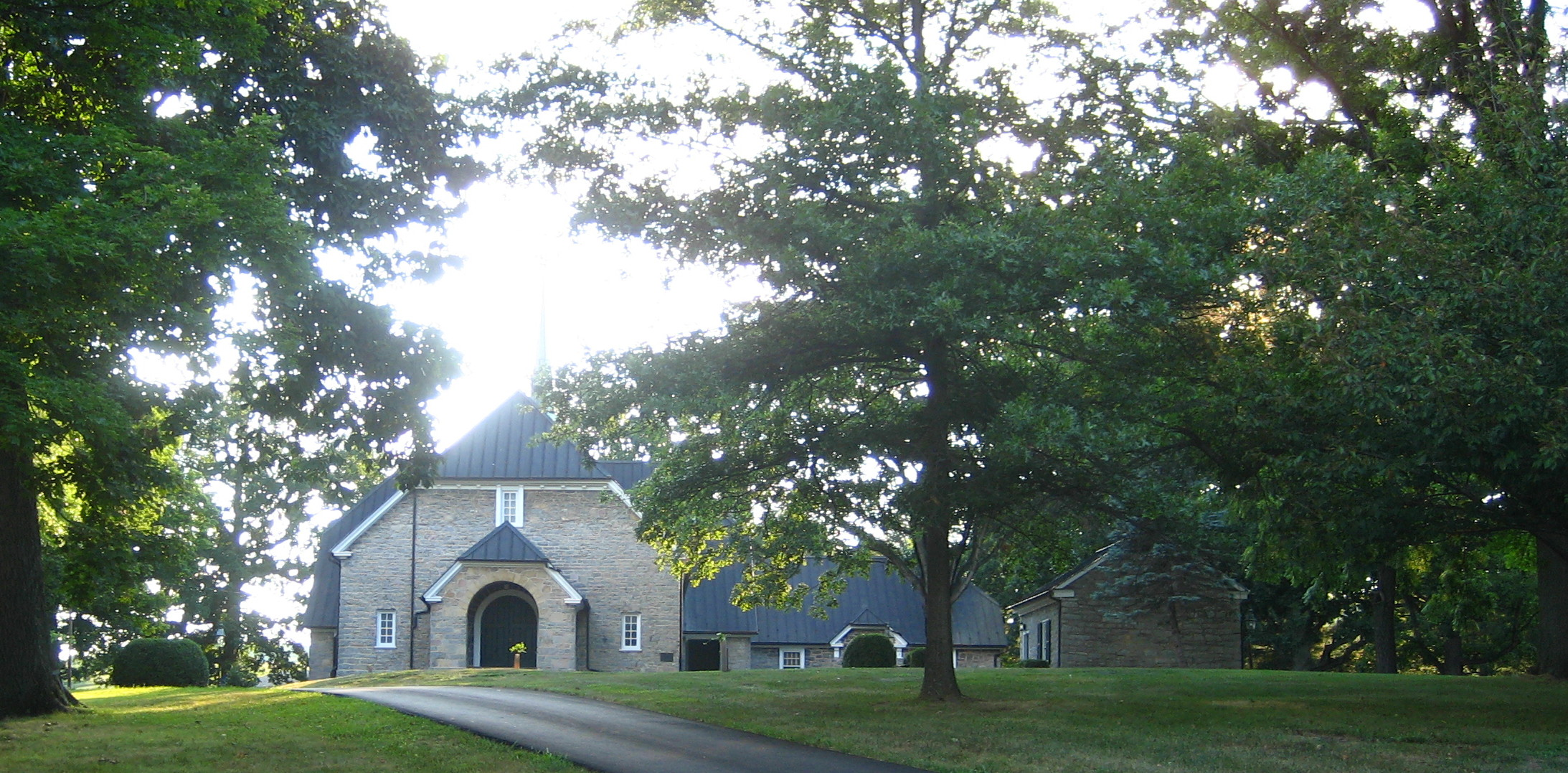
The Augusta Stone Church in Augusta County, built in 1749, is the oldest Presbyterian church building in continuous use in Virginia

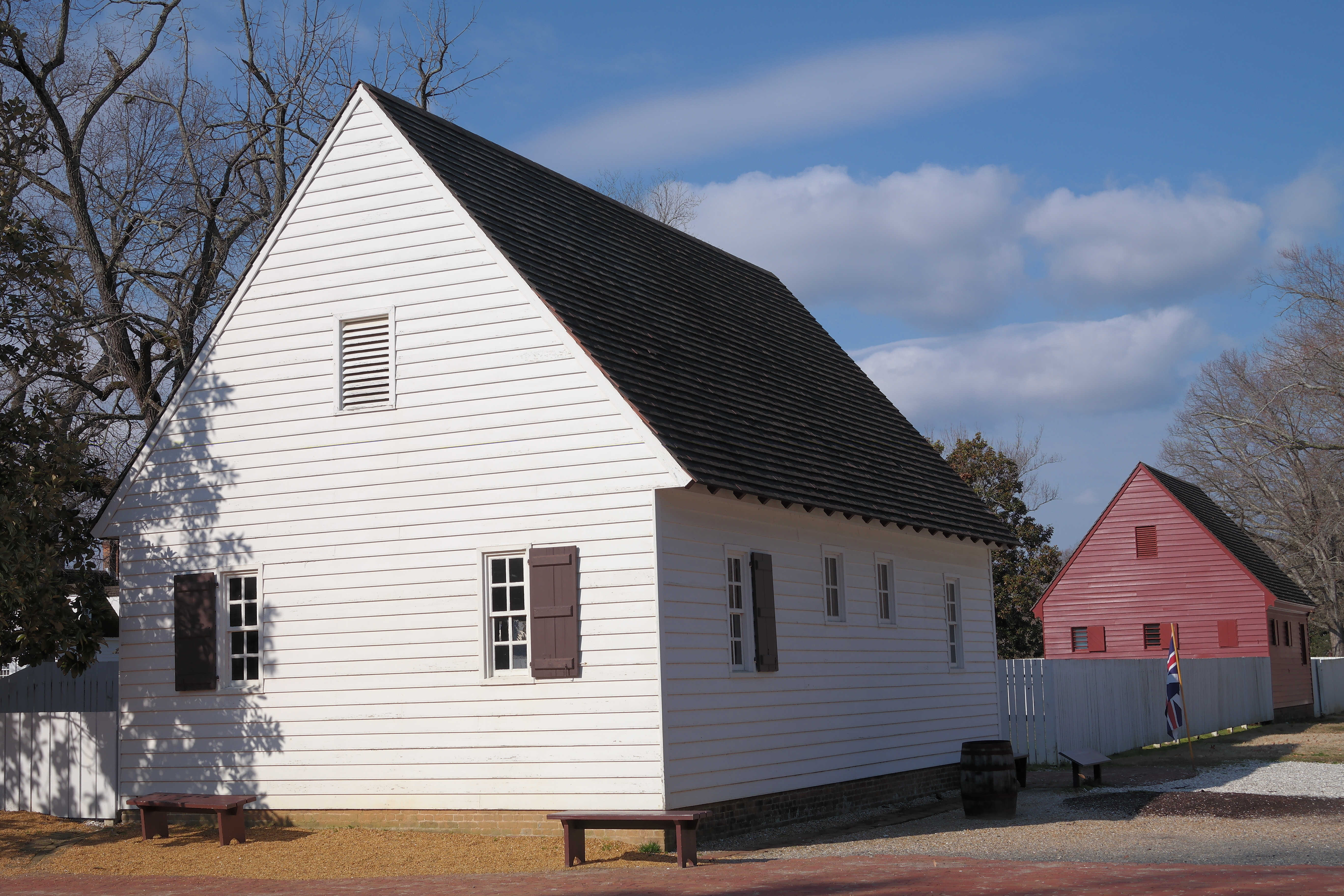
Presbyterian Meeting House at Colonial Williamsburg

The Presbyterians were evangelical dissenters, mostly Scotch-Irish Americans who expanded in Virginia between 1740 and 1758, immediately before the Baptists. The Church of Scotland had first adopted presbyterian ideas in the 1560s, which brought it into continuing conflict with the Church of England following the Union of Crowns.

Where Presbyterians dominated the parish and county, they could exercise power through the established church's vestry, whose composition reflected their leadership and influence. For example, Presbyterians filled at least nine of the twelve positions on the first vestry of Augusta parish in Staunton, Virginia, founded in 1746.

The First Great Awakening impacted the area in the 1740s, leading Samuel Davies to be sent from Pennsylvania in 1747 to lead and minister to religious dissenters in Hanover County, Virginia. He eventually helped found the first presbytery in Virginia (the Presbytery of Hanover), evangelized slaves (remarkable in its time,), and influenced young Patrick Henry who traveled with his mother to listen to sermons.

Spangler (2008) argues that Presbyterians were more energetic and held frequent services better attuned to the frontier conditions of the colony. Presbyterianism grew in frontier areas where the Anglicans had made little impress, especially the western areas of the Piedmont and the valley of Virginia. Uneducated whites and blacks were attracted to the emotional worship of the denomination, its emphasis on biblical simplicity, and its psalm singing. Presbyterians were a cross-section of society; they were involved in slaveholding and in patriarchal ways of household management, while the Presbyterian Church government featured few democratic elements. Some local Presbyterian churches, such as Briery in Prince Edward County owned slaves. The Briery church purchased five slaves in 1766 and raised money for church expenses by hiring them out to local planters.

=== Baptists ===
Helped by the First Great Awakening and numerous itinerant self-proclaimed missionaries, by the 1760s Baptists were drawing Virginians, especially poor white farmers, into a new, much more democratic religion. Slaves were welcome at the services and many became Baptists at this time.

Baptist services were highly emotional; the only ritual was baptism, which was applied by immersion (not sprinkling like the Anglicans) only to adults. Opposed to the low moral standards prevalent in the colony, the Baptists strictly enforced their own high standards of personal morality, with special concern for sexual misconduct, heavy drinking, frivolous spending, missing services, cursing, and revelry. Church trials were held frequently and members who did not submit to disciple were expelled.

Some notable early Baptist ministers in Virginia include John Leland and Elijah Baker.

Historians have debated the implications of the religious rivalries for the American Revolution. The Baptist farmers did introduce a new egalitarian ethic that largely displaced the semi-aristocratic ethic of the Anglican planters. However, both groups supported the Revolution. There was a sharp contrast between the austerity of the plain-living Baptists and the opulence of the Anglican planters, who controlled local government. Baptist church discipline, mistaken by the gentry for radicalism, served to ameliorate disorder. As population became more dense, the county court and the Anglican Church were able to increase their authority. The Baptists protested vigorously; the resulting social disorder resulted chiefly from the ruling gentry's disregard of public need. The vitality of the religious opposition made the conflict between 'evangelical' and 'gentry' styles a bitter one. The strength of the evangelical movement's organization determined its ability to mobilize power outside the conventional authority structure. The struggle for religious toleration erupted and was played out during the American Revolution, as the Baptists, in alliance with Anglicans Thomas Jefferson and James Madison worked successfully to disestablish the Anglican church.

The first known imprisonment of Baptists in Virginia occurred in Spotsylvania County on Jun 4, 1768, when the sheriff arrested John Waller, Lewis Craig, James Read, James Chiles, and William Mash, all of whom were Separatists. The prosecutor insisted to the magistrate that "these men are great disturbers of the peace; they cannot meet a man upon the road, but they must ram a text of scripture down his throat." One of the last Baptist ministers to be jailed was Elijah Baker in 1778, who spent 56 days awaiting trial in Accomack County, Virginia. After the Revolutionary War, the Anglicans lost much of their influence, but some level of persecution of the Baptists continued up until the system was fully disestablished by the Virginia Statute for Religious Freedom in 1786.

=== Methodists ===
Methodism arose in the 18th century as a movement within the Anglican church. Methodist missionaries were active in the late colonial period. From 1776 to 1815, Methodist Bishop Francis Asbury made 42 trips into the western parts of Virginia to visit Methodist congregations.

Methodists encouraged an end to slavery, and welcomed free blacks and slaves into active roles in the congregations. Like the Baptists, Methodists made conversions among slaves and free blacks, and provided more of a welcome to them than in the Anglican Church. Some blacks were selected as preachers. During the Revolutionary War, about 700 Methodist slaves sought freedom behind British lines. The British transported them and other Black Loyalists, as they were called, for resettlement to its colony of Nova Scotia. In 1791 Britain helped some of the Black Loyalists, who had encountered racism among other Loyalists, and problems with the climate and land given to them, to resettle in Sierra Leone in Africa.

Following the Revolution, in the 1780s, itinerant Methodist preachers carried copies of an anti-slavery petition in their saddlebags throughout the state, calling for an end to slavery. In addition, they encouraged slaveholders to manumit their slaves. So many slaveholders did so that the proportion of free blacks in Virginia in the first two decades after the Revolutionary War increased to 7.3 percent of the population, from less than one percent.

At the same time, counter-petitions were circulated. The petitions were presented to the Assembly; they were debated, but no legislative action was taken, and after 1800 there was gradually reduced religious opposition to slavery as it had renewed economic importance after invention of the cotton gin.

== Religious freedom and disestablishment ==
At the start of the American Revolution, the Anglican Patriots realized that they needed dissenter support for effective wartime mobilization, so they met most of the dissenters' demands in return for their support of the war effort. During the war, 24 (19%) of the 124 Anglican ministers were active Loyalists. They generally went into exile, and Britain paid some of their financial losses.

After the American victory in the war, the Anglican establishment sought to reintroduce state support for religion. This effort failed when non-Anglicans gave their support to Thomas Jefferson's "Bill for Establishing Religious Freedom", which eventually became law in 1786. With freedom of religion the new watchword, the Church of England was dis-established in Virginia. When possible, worship continued in the usual fashion, but the local vestry no longer distributed tax money or had local government functions such as poor relief. The Right Reverend James Madison (1749–1812), a cousin of Patriot James Madison, was appointed in 1790 as the first Episcopal Bishop of Virginia and he slowly rebuilt the denomination within freedom of choice of belief and worship.

At the same time, the statute opened the way for new religious traditions. The first Jewish synagogue in Virginia was founded in 1789, Kahal Kadosh Beth Shalome. Construction on the Church of Saint Mary in Alexandria was begun in 1795, becoming the first Catholic church in Virginia since the failed Jesuit Mission in the 16th century.

The principle of disestablishment would subsequently be included in the First Amendment to the United States Constitution, ratified in December 1791.

Virginia's Glebe Act of 1802 resulted in the sale or turnover of vacant Episcopal/Anglican parish land, often to other more active church congregations/denominations.

== See also ==
- History of religion in the United States
- History of Christianity in the United States
- History of Protestantism in the United States
- Pohick Church, parish church of George Washington
