= Richard Stearns =

Richard Stearns may refer to:

- Richard Stearns (World Vision), president of the evangelical charity World Vision
- Richard E. Stearns (born 1936), American theoretical computer scientist
- Richard G. Stearns (born 1944), United States federal judge
- Richard Stearns (sailor) (1927–2022), American Olympic sailor
- R. H. Stearns (1824–1909), tradesman, philanthropist, and politician from Massachusetts

== See also ==
- Richard Sterne (disambiguation)
- Richard Stern (disambiguation)
