= Stearnes, Virginia =

Unincorporated community in Virginia, United States

Coordinates: 37°42′02″N 78°14′20″W

Stearnes is an unincorporated community in Fluvanna County, in the U.S. state of Virginia.
