= Frank Preston Stearns =

American abolitionist and author

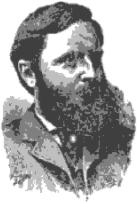
- Born: January 4, 1846; Medford, Massachusetts, US
- Died: January 21, 1917 (aged 71); Arlington, Massachusetts, US
- Burial place: Mount Auburn Cemetery
- Spouse: Emilia Maciel (m. 1898)
- Children: 1
- Father: George Luther Stearns

Frank Preston Stearns (1846–1917) was an American abolitionist, author, and critic. He was known as a biographer of noted Americans and Italians.

== Early life ==
Frank Preston Stearns was born in Medford, Massachusetts on January 4, 1846. He was the son of Mary E. (née Preston) and George Luther Stearns, an industrialist and noted abolitionist. Stearns received his early education at F. B. Sanborn's School in Concord, Massachusetts.

Stearns followed his father in becoming an abolitionist. He collaborated with Elizur Wright in ambitious projects, such as the American Anti-Slavery Society.

During the American Civil War, Stearns helped his father recruit men for the 54th and 55th Massachusettes Colored Regiments in Buffalo, New York. Later, the recruited soldiers at Fortress Monroe and Philadelphia, Pennsylvania.

Stearns graduated from Harvard University in 1867. While there, he was a member of The Dickey Club and the Hasty Pudding Club. He was also a co-founder of The Harvard Advocate, a campus literary magazine.

Stearns returned home to care for his family after his father died in 1867. Stearns discovered that he was disinherited from his father's estate, although his father had intended to change this before his death. The pressure of caring for his family without means or a profession caused Stearns to develop a nervous disorder, something that he never fully recovered from.

Charles Sumner helped Stearns secure a government job, which he kept for several years. His health improved and he studied literature with David Atwood Wasson, a minister and author.

== Career ==
Stearns began his literary career by writing magazine articles. Stearns traveled to Italy and Germany, where he studied art criticism and literature. He wrote several works exploring the lives and careers of important public figures and authors of note, including The Life and Genius of Nathaniel Hawthorne, The Life of Prince Otto von Bismarck, and The Life and Public Services of George Luther Stearns. Other books include Napolian and Machiavelli, Mid-Summer of Italian Art, Sketches from Concord.

He was a member of the Boston Authors Club and the Authors Club of London.

== Personal life ==
He married Emilia Maciel on September 28, 1898. They had one child, George L. Stearns.

Stearns mental health delcined in his later years, with The Boston Globe reporting that he was "suffering from a nervous breakdown for several years". He spent time in sanittariums in an effort to regain his health.

Stearns died from a cerebral hemorrhage at Symmes Hospital in Arlington, Massachusetts on January 21, 1917. His funeral was attended by Harvard alumni and other writers. He was buried in Mount Auburn Cemetery.

== Selected publications ==
=== Books ===
- John Brown. Boston Cupples and Hurd, 1889.
- The Real and Ideal in Literature. Boston: J. G. Cupples Company, 1892.
- Life and Genius of Jacopo Robusti, Called Tintoretto. New York: G. P. Putnam's Sons, 1894.
- Cambridge Sketches. Philadelphia: J. B. Lippincott Company, 1895.
- Sketches from Concord and Appledore. Concord Thirty Years Ago; Nathaniel Hawthorne; Louisa M. Alcott; Ralph Waldo Emerson; Matthew Arnold; David A. Wasson; Wendell Phillips; Appledore and its visitors; John Greenleaf Whittier. New York: G. P. Putnam's Sons, 1895.
- Modern Prose Writers. New York: G. P. Putnam's Sons, 1897.
- The Life of Prince Otto Von Bismark. Philadelphia: J. B. Lippincott Company, 1899.
- Four Great Venetians; An Account of the Lives and works of Giorgione, Titian, Tintoretto, and Il Veronese. Freeport: Books for Libraries, 1969 reprint, originally published in 1900.
- Mid-Summer of Italian Art: Containing an Examination of the works of Michel Angelo, Leonardo da Vinci, Raphael Santi, and Correggio. New York: G. P. Putnam's Sons, 1900.
- Space and Time: A Critique on Herbert Spencer. New York: The Knickerbocker Press, 1900.
- Napolian and Machiavelli; Two Essays in Political Science. Cambridge: The Riverside Press, 1903.
- True Republicanism; or, The Real and Ideal in Politics. Philadelphia: J. B. Lippincott Company, 1904.
- Cambridge Sketches. Philadelphia: J. B. Lippincott Company, 1905.
- The Life and Genius of Nathaniel Hawthorne. Philadelphia: J. B. Lippincott Company, 1906.
- The Life and Public Services of George Luther Stearns. Philadelphia: J. B. Lippincott Company, 1907.
- Germanophobia and Other Fallacies. 1913.
- Politics and Metaphysics. Boston: Richard G. Badger, 1915.

=== Articles ===
- "Vanderbilt and Lincoln: An Anecdote of the Civil War". The New England Magazine (March 1909). pp. 58–59.
