= Frances Stearns =

American politician (1907–2001)

Member of the Connecticut House of Representatives from Mansfield
- In office 1955–1957 Serving with Edwin O. Smith
- Preceded by: Edwin O. Smith; John A. Wadsworth
- Succeeded by: Edwin O. Smith; Foster Richards

Personal details
- Born: Frances Crane; April 16, 1907 Mansfield, Connecticut, U.S.
- Died: May 9, 2001 (aged 94) Mansfield, Connecticut, U.S.
- Party: Republican
- Spouse: Willard J. Stearns

Frances Stearns (April 16, 1907 – May 9, 2001) was an American politician who served in the Connecticut House of Representatives from 1955 to 1957, representing the town of Mansfield as a Republican. Her husband, Willard J. Stearns, also served as a state representative.
