= Stern (given name) =

Stern is a given name. Notable people with the name include:

- Carola Stern (1925-2006), German journalist and writer
- Stern Hu (born 1963), Australian businessman
- Stern John (born 1976), Trinidadian football manager and former player
- Stern Noel Liffa (born 2000), Malawian athlete

== See also ==
- Stern (surname)
- Stearne, given name and surname
