= Shubal Stearns =

American Baptist minister (1706–1771)

Shubal Stearns (sometimes spelled Shubael; 28 January 1706 – November 20, 1771), was a colonial evangelist and preacher during the Great Awakening. He converted after hearing George Whitefield and planted a Baptist Church in Sandy Creek, Guilford County, North Carolina. Stearns' highly successful ministry was related to the rise and expansion of the Separate Baptists — especially in much of the American South.

== Life ==
Stearns was born in Boston. His family were members of the Congregational church in Tolland, Connecticut, when in 1745 he heard evangelist George Whitefield. Whitefield preached that, instead of trying to reform the Congregational church over doctrinal issues, members needed to separate from it; hence his followers were called the "New-Lights". Stearns was converted, became a preacher, and adopted the Great Awakening's view of revival and conversion. The "New Lights" also came to be called the "Separates", in part because they pointed to 2 Cor. 6:17 "be ye separate", ie, from the mainstream "Old Light" Congregational church.

Stearns' church became involved in the controversy over the proper subjects of baptism in 1751. Soon, Stearns rejected infant baptism and sought baptism at the hands of Wait Palmer, Baptist minister of Stonington, Connecticut. By March, Shubal Stearns was ordained into the Baptist ministry by Palmer and Joshua Morse, the pastor of New London, Connecticut. His church of "Separates", by becoming Baptists, were from then on to be known as the Separate Baptists.

In 1754, Stearns and some of his followers moved south to Opequon, Virginia, at that time on the western frontier. Here he joined Daniel Marshall and wife Martha (Stearns' sister), who were already active in a Baptist church there. During his brief time in Virginia, Stearns and Marshall preached the Gospel with great zeal; they were accused of being "disorderly ministers" by some stalwarts, who complained to the Philadelphia Association, but this charge was dismissed.

On November 22, 1755, Stearns and his party moved further south to Sandy Creek, in Guilford County, North Carolina to build a new church. This party consisted of eight men and their wives, mostly relatives of Stearns. He pastored at Sandy Creek until his death. From there, Separate Baptists spread in the South. The church quickly grew from 16 members to 606. Church members moved to other areas and started other churches.

The Sandy Creek Association was formed in 1758. Morgan Edwards, a Baptist minister who visited Sandy Creek the year after Stearns' death, recorded that, "in 17 years, [Sandy Creek] has spread its branches westward as far as the great river Mississippi; southward as far as Georgia; eastward to the sea and Chesopeck [sic] Bay; and northward to the waters of the Pottowmack [sic]; it, in 17 years, is become mother, grandmother, and great grandmother to 42 churches, from which sprang 125 ministers." Based on the testimony of those who remembered him, Edwards described Stearns as fervent and charismatic preacher who was capable of inspiring the most powerful emotions in his congregation.

None of Stearns' sermons has survived in writing. His central theme was recounted as discussing the need for followers of Christ to be "born again" from within. At first churchgoers in North Carolina found this a difficult concept as they never thought of their religion as anything more than external.

But, Stearns' style of preaching and emphasis on internal conversion were highly important to Southern religion. He became the model for many other preachers who sought to copy his example, down to the least gesture or inflection of voice. Stearns believed that God pours his spirit like water upon a new believer, requiring no special learning or instruction; and this 'outpouring' swiftly became a flood that spread from Sandy Creek throughout all parts of the southern frontier.

Stearns was married to Sarah Johnson, and they had no children.

== See also ==
- George Whitefield
- Herman Husband
- Elijah Baker (preacher)
- Bible Belt
- Regulator Movement in North Carolina
- John Leland (Baptist)
