= Steno (lunar crater) =

Crater on the Moon

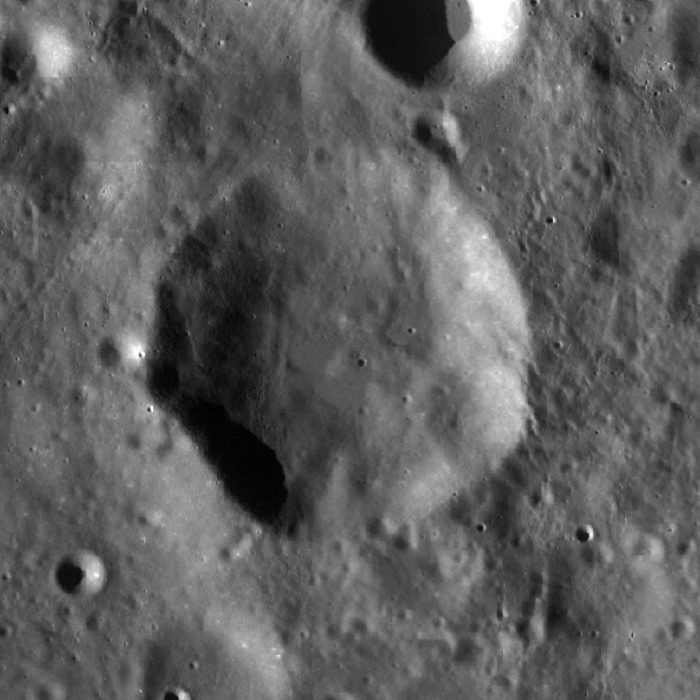
- LRO image
- Coordinates: 32.8°N 161.8°E
- Diameter: 31 km
- Colongitude: 199° at sunrise
- Eponym: Nicolas Steno

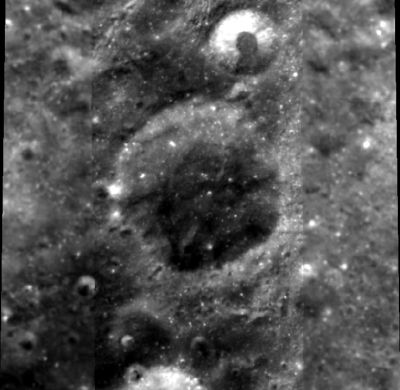
Clementine image

Steno is a relatively small lunar impact crater that is located in the northern hemisphere on the Moon's far side. It lies to the south-southwest of the slightly larger crater Stearns, a much younger and less worn formation. Farther to the northwest of Steno is Appleton, and to the east is Nušl.

This is a worn crater formation that has a circular outer rim that remains relatively well-defined. The rim edge is marked only by a few tiny craterlets. The interior floor and inner walls are nearly featureless, except for a few faint groove marks and some tiny craterlets. It is otherwise an undistinguished formation.

The crater was named after the 17th century Danish astronomer Nicolas Steno.

== Satellite craters ==
By convention these features are identified on lunar maps by placing the letter on the side of the crater midpoint that is closest to Steno.

Steno	Latitude	Longitude	Diameter
N	31.3° N	161.4° E	20 km
Q	29.3° N	157.8° E	29 km
R	31.3° N	158.9° E	17 km
T	32.7° N	159.7° E	37 km
U	33.1° N	158.3° E	27 km
