= Stern Hall =

Stern Hall is the name of several buildings, including:

- A University of California, Berkeley dormitory Stern Hall (Berkeley)
- An alternate name for Carnegie Hall's Isaac Stern Auditorium
- A Dillard University science building, housing two academic divisions and several laboratories
- A Hobart and William Smith College social science building, housing four academic departments
- An Intrepid Sea-Air-Space Museum building, housing exhibits on pioneering naval events
- A Mills College building
- A Stanford University building complex, housing six dormitories
- A Tulane University science building, housing five academic departments
- A Waterford-KaMhlaba United World College of Southern Africa auditorium

Other

- Stern Hall, Inc., a Chicago-based event/consumer/trade marketing agency.
