= Sterns (surname) =

Sterns is a surname. Notable people with the name include:

- Caden Sterns (born 1999), American football player
- Henry Sterns, American bobsledder
- Jerreth Sterns (born 1999), American football player
- Jonathan Sterns (1751–1798), Loyalist
- Kate Sterns, Canadian writer

== See also ==
- Stearns (surname)
- Stern (surname)
