= Stearns (crater) =

Crater on the Moon

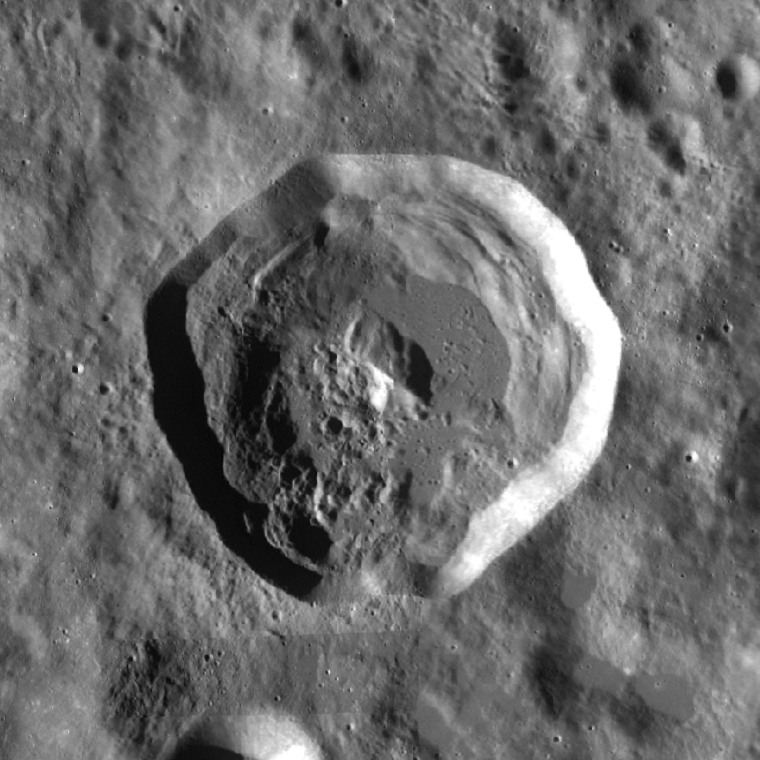
- LRO image
- Coordinates: 34.8°N 162.6°E
- Diameter: 36 km
- Depth: Unknown
- Colongitude: 198° at sunrise
- Formation: Eratosthenian
- Eponym: Carl L. Stearns

Stearns is a lunar impact crater on the far side of the Moon. Unlike many lunar craters, this is a relatively fresh and well-defined impact feature with little appearance of erosion. The rim edge is sharp and roughly circular, with some unevenness. The inner walls are simple slopes down to piles of talus along the base. At the midpoint of the somewhat uneven interior floor is a central peak.

This crater is located about midway between Appleton to the northwest and Nušl to the southeast. Just over one crater diameter to the south-southwest of Stearns is the smaller crater Steno.

Stearns is a crater of Eratosthenian age.

== See also ==
- Asteroid 2035 Stearns
