= Sterne (surname) =

Sterne is a surname. It is a variant of Stern, and as such, is either of English (meaning "strict") or German (meaning "star") origin, with many Ashkenazi Jews having adopted the surname as well, due to the Ashkenazi Jewish trend of adopting secular German surnames denoting either profession or natural elements during the early modern period when they were forced to Germanize and/or Slavicize their naming customs. As such, its bearers are concentrated in England, its former colonies, Germany, France, Central Europe and Eastern Europe. Notable people with the surname include:

- Adolphus Sterne (1801–1852), American politician
- Bobbie L. Sterne (born 1919), the Mayor of Cincinnati from 1975–1976 and 1978–1979
- Carus Sterne (pen-name), see Ernst Krause
- David Sterne, British actor
- Emma Gelders Sterne (1894–1971), American writer
- Gordon Sterne (1923–2017), German actor seen in An American Werewolf in London and Highlander
- Hedda Sterne (1910–2011), Romanian painter
- John Sterne (bishop of Colchester) (died 1607), Bishop of Colchester
- John Sterne (bishop of Dromore) (1660–1745), Irish churchman
- Laurence Sterne (1713–1768), an Irish-born English novelist and an Anglican clergyman
- Maurice Sterne (1878–1957), American sculptor and painter
- Richard Sterne (bishop) (c.1596–1683), a Church of England priest and Archbishop of York
- Richard Sterne (golfer) (born 1981)
- Robert Sterne Thomas The Scout Association Scouting notable, awardee of the Bronze Wolf in 1965
- Simon Sterne (1839–1901), American lawyer and economist
- Stuart Sterne (pen-name), see Gertrude Bloede (1845–1905)
- Teresa Sterne (1927–2000), American concert pianist

Fictional characters:

- Silas Sterne, children's book character in The Day My Bum Went Psycho (2001)

== See also ==
- Stern (surname)
- Stearne, given name and surname
