= Stearne =

Stearne is a given name and a surname. Notable people with the name include:

== Given name ==
- Stearne Tighe Edwards (1893–1918), Canadian flying ace
- Stearne Miller (1813–1897), Irish politician and barrister
- Robert Stearne Tighe (1760–1835), Irish writer

== Surname ==
- John Stearne (physician) (1624–1669), Irish physician
- John Stearne (witch-hunter) (c. 1610 – 1670), English witch hunter
- Kelly Stearne (1958–2016), Canadian curler

== See also ==
- Stearn, surname
- Sterne (surname)
- Stern (given name)
