= George Luther Stearns =

American abolitionist and industrialist

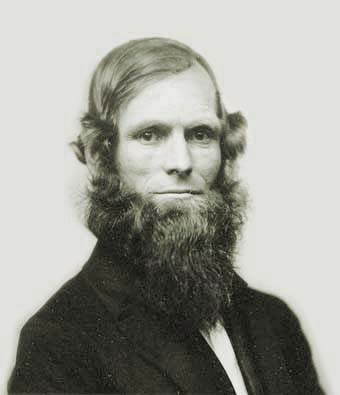
- Born: January 8, 1809; Medford, Massachusetts
- Died: April 9, 1867 (aged 58); New York City, New York
- Occupation: Merchant
- Children: Frank Preston Stearns

George Luther Stearns (January 8, 1809 – April 9, 1867) was an American industrialist and merchant in Medford, Massachusetts, as well as an abolitionist and a noted recruiter of black soldiers for the Union Army during the American Civil War.

== Biography ==
=== Early life and family ===
George L. Stearns was born in Medford, Massachusetts, on January 8, 1809, the eldest son and second child of Luther and Mary (Hall) Stearns. His paternal immigrant ancestor, Isaac Sterne, arrived in Salem on June 12, 1630, from Suffolk, England. He had sailed to the new colony with John Winthrop, a future governor, and Sir Richard Saltonstall, among others. Isaac Sterne moved to Watertown, located along the Charles River, where he died in 1671. What became known as the American Stearns family (note spelling variation) grew, with branches moving northward and westward. For decades men typically worked as farmers, teachers, and clergymen.

Stearns' father, Luther Stearns, was born on February 17, 1770, the eldest of five children born to Captain Josiah Stearns, a soldier in the American Revolutionary War. He commanded a company of 50 men from Lunenburg, Massachusetts. Luther Stearns had entered Dartmouth College at age seventeen but transferred, graduating from Harvard in 1791. He worked as a tutor at Harvard and eventually studied medicine. He later became an obstetrician. He was honored in 1811 by an honorary degree from Harvard.

After getting his practice started, Luther married Mary Hall of Brattleboro, Vermont, on December 29, 1799; she was 16 years old, not an uncommon marrying age for women. They settled in Medford, Massachusetts, to be closer to her relatives. They had three children together: Elizabeth Hall, George Luther, and Henry Laurens Stearns (named after the American ambassador of that name, a distant relative). The senior Stearns later opened a private preparatory school for boys in Medford; many students came from the American South and the West Indies.

Stearns died of pneumonia on April 27, 1820, when son George was eleven years old. To earn money, young George sometimes tended the locks on the Middlesex Canal in town. At the age of 15, he entered the workforce to support his mother and sisters.

=== Career ===
In early life, Stearns was engaged in the business of ship-chandlery. After a prosperous career, he began the manufacture of sheet and pipe-lead, doing business in Boston and residing in Medford.

He married Mary Elizabeth Preston on October 12, 1843. They met through acquaintances, including her father Warren Preston, a probate judge in Norridgewock, Maine; and Lydia Maria Child, an American abolitionist and women's rights activist, who was her aunt.

Before voting in the Missouri and Kansas territories about the future of slavery in each jurisdiction, Stearns was one of the chief financiers of the Emigrant Aid Company. It supported the settlement of Kansas by antislavery homesteaders. He identified with the antislavery cause, and became a Free-soiler in 1848.

He also established in his Medford mansion an important station of the Underground Railroad to help escaped refugee slaves to gain freedom (some continued to Canada, which had abolished slavery). Stearns was one of the "Secret Six" who aided John Brown in Kansas, and financially supported him for the raid on Harpers Ferry; Brown was executed for this attack. Stearns had owned the pikes and 200 Sharps rifles taken to Harpers Ferry by Brown and his followers. Following Brown's arrest, Stearns briefly fled to Canada but returned to Medford to face inquiry following Brown's execution.

Soon after the opening of the Civil War, Stearns advocated the enlistment of African Americans in the Union Army. Massachusetts governor John Andrew asked Stearns to recruit the first two Northern state-sponsored black infantry regiments. He contributed strongly to recruiting the enlistees of the 54th and 55th Massachusetts regiments and the 5th cavalry.

Stearns was commissioned as major through the recommendation of Secretary of War Edwin M. Stanton. Later he also enlisted black soldiers for the U.S. Colored Troops from Pennsylvania, Maryland, and Tennessee. He is credited with recruiting more than 13,000 African Americans. He also established schools for their children and found work for their families while the men served in the army.

Stearns founded the Nation, Commonwealth, and Right Way newspapers for the dissemination of his ideas.

After President Abraham Lincoln's Emancipation Proclamation in January 1863, Stearns worked tirelessly for the civil rights of African Americans. Among his many admirers and friends were Louisa May Alcott, Henry David Thoreau, Charles Sumner, Frederick Douglass, and President Andrew Johnson. He also helped to found the Freedmen's Bureau, a federal organization designed to support emancipated African Americans (freedmen) in the South after the end of the war.

== Death and legacy ==
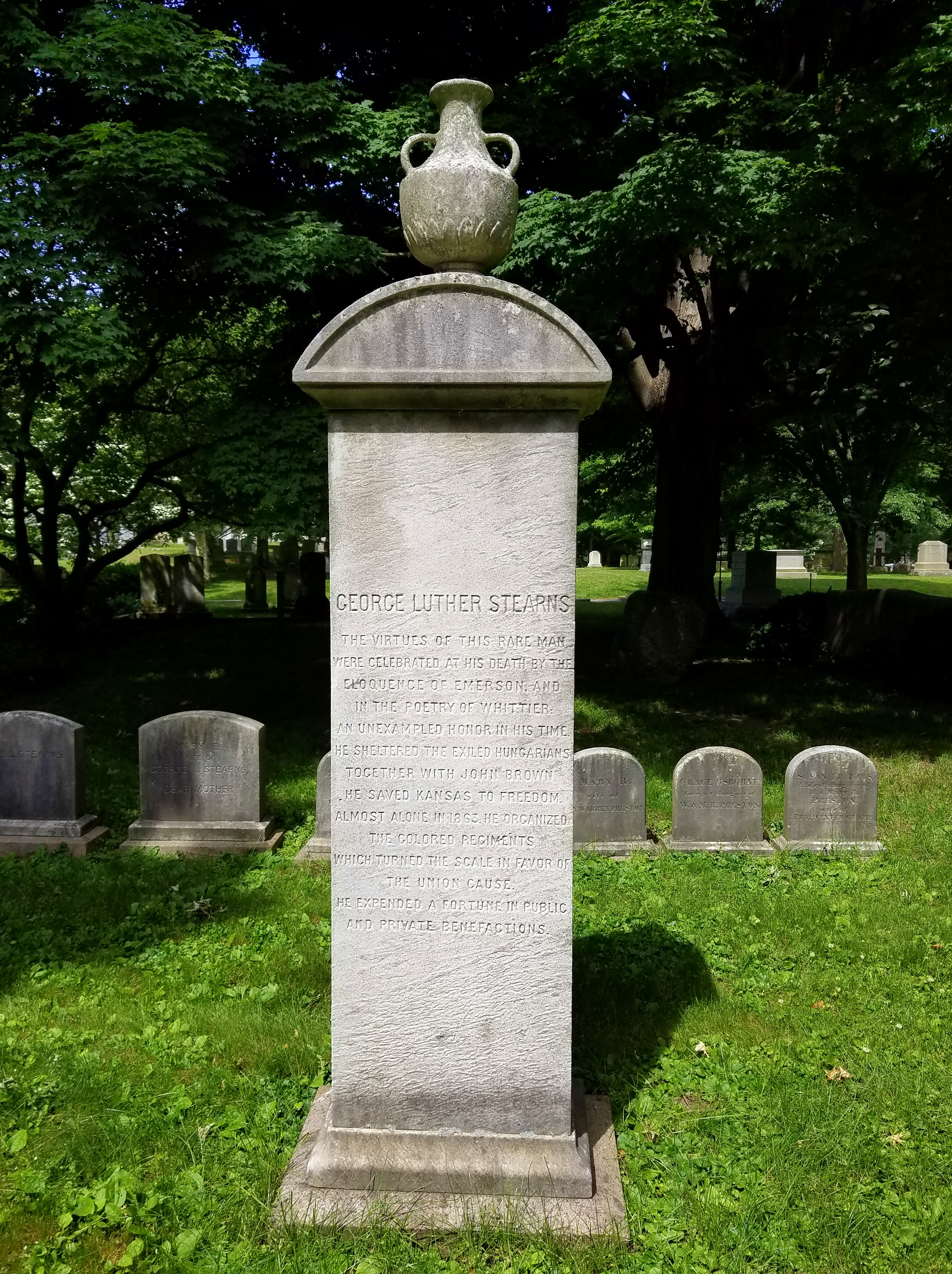
George Luther Stearns gravestone in Mount Auburn Cemetery

Stearns died of pneumonia in New York City, New York on April 9, 1867. Ralph Waldo Emerson gave the eulogy at his funeral at the First Parish Church in Medford (Unitarian).

Writer John Greenleaf Whittier published a poem in honor of Stearns in the May 1867 edition of the Atlantic Monthly, entitled "G.L.S." It read, in part:

"No duty could overtask him;
No need his will outrun;
Or ever our lips could ask him;
His hands the work had done."

"A man who asked not to be great;
But as he served and saved the state."

In 1897, a monument was erected on Boston Common to commemorate Colonel Robert Gould Shaw and the 54th Massachusetts regiment he commanded. Together with 20 of his men, he was killed in July 1863 in the Second Battle of Fort Wagner. At the dedication of the monument, Booker T. Washington, President of Tuskegee Institute, made an address. He attributed the organization and recruiting of the US Colored Troops to be the work "of John A. Andrew ... and that of George L. Stearns, who, with hidden generosity and a great sweet heart, helped to turn the darkest hour into day, and in doing so freely gave service, fortune and life itself to the cause which this day commemorates."

Following this commemoration, Joseph H. Smith, a veteran of the 54th, started a movement to have a commemorative tablet placed in the Statehouse at Boston, to honor Major Stearns' services. The resolution was passed in 1897 to place a tablet in Memorial Hall or other establishments in Boston and signed by Governor Wolcott. It was not enacted at the time, but a second resolution was passed in 1901 by the Massachusetts legislature to authorize it.

The tablet is entitled: "In Memoriam George Luther Stearns" and says, in part:

A merchant of Boston who illustrated in his life and character the nobility and generosity of citizenship. Giving his life and fortune for the overthrow of slavery and the preservation of free institutions. To his unresting devotion and unfailing hope, Massachusetts owes the Fifty-fourth and Fifth-fifth Regiments of colored infantry, and the federal government ten thousand troops, at a critical moment in the great war. In the darkest hour of the republic, his faith in the people never wavered.
