= R. H. Stearns Building =

- R. H. Stearns House
- U.S. National Register of Historic Places
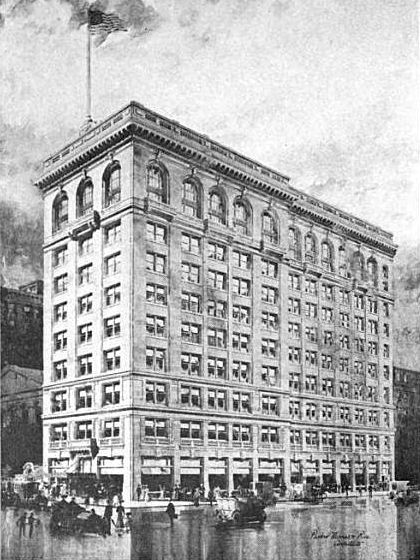
- R.H. Stearns Building on Temple Place and Tremont Street in 1914 from Rossiter's book Days and ways in old Boston, 3rd ed. Boston: R.H. Stearns and Company, 1914

- Location within Boston Location within Massachusetts Location within the United States
- Location: 140 Tremont St., Boston, Massachusetts
- Coordinates: 42°21′20.4″N 71°3′45.5″W
- Area: less than one acre
- Built: 1909
- Architect: Parker, Thomas & Rice; Wells Bros. Co.
- Architectural style: Beaux Arts
- NRHP reference No.: 80000671
- Added to NRHP: June 16, 1980

The R. H. Stearns Building is an 11-story residence building (with shops at ground level) at 140 Tremont Street in Boston. It was built in 1909 for the businessman R. H. Stearns and his company and was the home of the R. H. Stearns and Company department store until the company's demise in 1977.

The Stearns store had been in many locations in Boston before finally settling in its new building and headquarters at 140 Tremont Street.

Since 1886 Stearns & Co. occupied and leased a re-modeled building on the site of the old Boston Masonic Temple, until it was completely torn down and the new R. H. Stearns building put up in 1908.

R. H. Stearns & Company ceased operations in 1978, and the building was converted to 140 studio and one-bedroom apartments for older adults and people with disabilities. The building was added to the National Register of Historic Places as R. H. Stearns House in 1980.

== See also ==
- National Register of Historic Places listings in northern Boston, Massachusetts

== Images ==
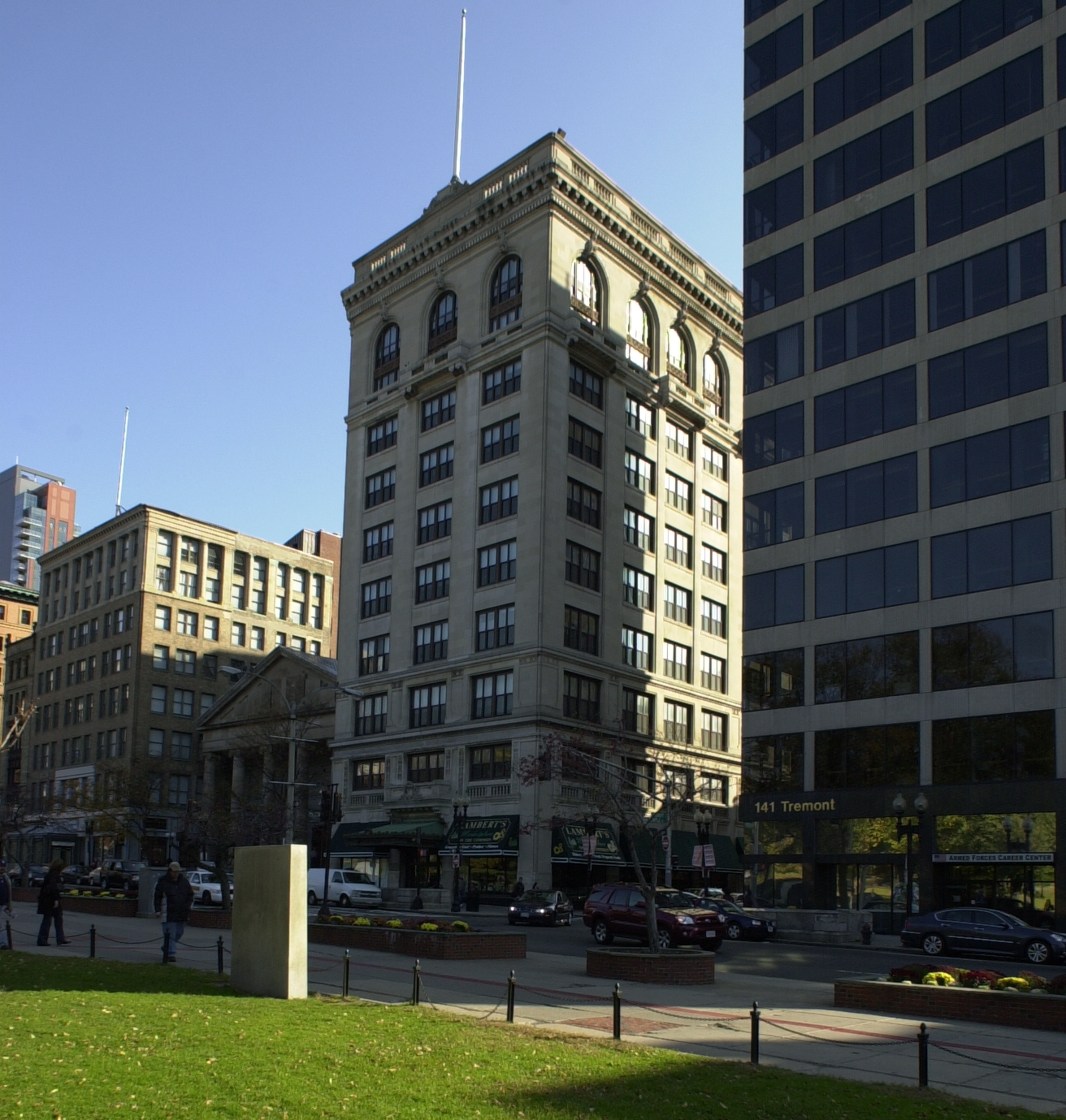
2009 photo of the R.H. Stearns Building taken from the Boston Common looking east across Tremont Street

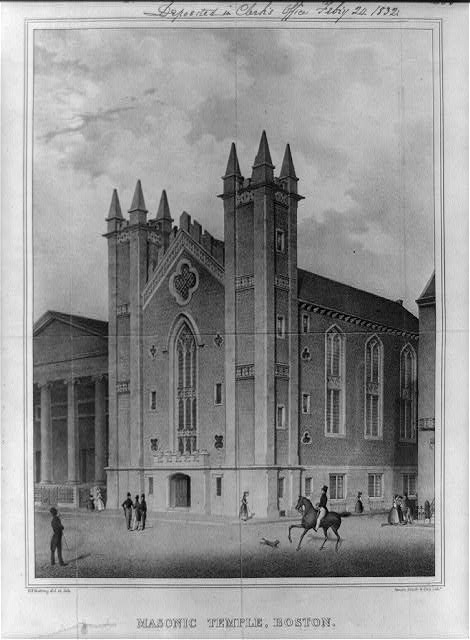
Masonic Temple at the corner of Tremont St. and Temple Place. Replaced by the Stearns building.
