= Martha Stearns Marshall =

Martha Stearns Marshall (1726–1771) was a Separate Baptist preacher in the Southern United States. She spread the gospel alongside her husband, Daniel Marshall (1706–84), who is generally regarded as the first great Baptist leader in the state of Georgia. Her husband was once jailed in Virginia for refusing to stop preaching the gospel. Although she was three months pregnant at the time, she exhorted those around that it was wrong to forbid a man to preach the Biblical truth of baptism. Her words convicted a young man named Cartledge and he became a preacher; she also converted the arresting constable and magistrate. She often stood alongside her brother Shubal Stearns and spoke at Baptist meetings. Martha also assisted her husband Daniel in his churches. She gave birth to six sons and two daughters.

== Contributions ==
In 1810, Virginia Baptist historian Robert Semple wrote of Marshall’s contributions to Baptist work:

'Mr. Marshall had a rare felicity of finding in this lady, a Priscilla, a helper in the gospel. In fact, it should not be concealed that his extraordinary success in the ministry, is ascribable in no small degree, to Mrs. Marshall’s unwearied, and zealous co-operation. Without the shadow of a usurped authority over the other sex, Mrs. Marshall, being a lady of good sense, singular piety, and surprising elocution, has, in countless instances melted a whole concourse into tears by her prayers and exhortations!'

Baptist historian George Paschal, in his History of North Carolina Baptists, wrote of Daniel and Martha:

“As a result of the labors of this earnest and fervent evangelist, in which he doubtless had the assistance of his saintly and gifted wife, Mrs. Martha Stearns Marshall, great numbers turned to the Lord.”

== Biography ==
In the late 1750s, the Marshalls founded a Separate Baptist church at Abbott's Creek in North Carolina. There Martha served alongside her husband and “was noted for her zeal and eloquence,” and she “added greatly to the interest of meetings conducted by her husband.” The first difficulty the new church encountered was that no minister would cooperate with Stearns in ordaining Daniel. A pastor in South Carolina refused to participate in an ordination service because Daniel and the Separate Baptists “allowed women to pray in public and illiterate men to preach, and encouraged noise and confusion in their meetings.” The ordination service finally took place when Elder Ledbetter, Daniel’s brother-in-law, agreed to participate in the ordination.

In 1771, the Marshalls moved to Columbia County, Georgia, where they founded the first Baptist church in Georgia, located at Kiokee. A. H. Newman wrote of their efforts in founding this work:

“Marshall was now sixty-four years old and had behind him a truly apostolic record. Almost equally useful was his wife, a sister of Shubal Stearns.”

== Legacy ==
In 2007, Baptist Women in Ministry instituted the Martha Stearns Marshall Day of Preaching to encourage churches to invite women to preach. On a Sunday in February each year, "we will join together to celebrate hearing the voices of women as they preach in pulpits across the United States. As more women enter the ministry, churches have a greater opportunity to welcome them into their pulpits," said Pam Durso, Associate Executive Director of the Baptist History and Heritage Society.

== Abbotts Creek Church Rules of Decorum ==
In 1832, the Abbotts Creek Church divided. The members who aligned with the missionary/Sunday school movement of the Southern Baptist Convention met in conference in June 1834 to reorganize. Below are items 5 and 7 of the Rules of Decorum that they drafted at this meeting:

5. It shall be the duty of each member to attend all church meetings by the hour of 11 O'clock and any member not prevented by known bodily infirmity failing to attend two meetings in succession shall be cited to come forward and show cause why he has done so. And if any female member not prevented by infirmity or disease repeatedly neglect to attend at church meeting, there shall be some person or persons to inquire the cause.

7. Every male member upon going to speak shall rise from his seat and address the Moderator and members generally.

It is evident from these two items that these Baptists did not encourage women to speak during their conference meetings, much less to preach during public worship. If Martha Marshall had been an ordained preacher in this church just 75 years earlier, these good Baptists evidently did not know it. These rules were not drafted by the "Old School" or Primitive Baptist side, but by the more progressive Missionary side.

Martha Marshall was the wife of Elder Daniel Marshall and was associated with the Baptist community at Abbotts Creek and other churches. Some historical accounts describe her involvement in religious activities and support of her husband's ministry. However, claims that these Baptists ordained women as gospel preachers are disputed by historians.
