= Richard J. Stern =

American financier and philanthropist (1913–2001)

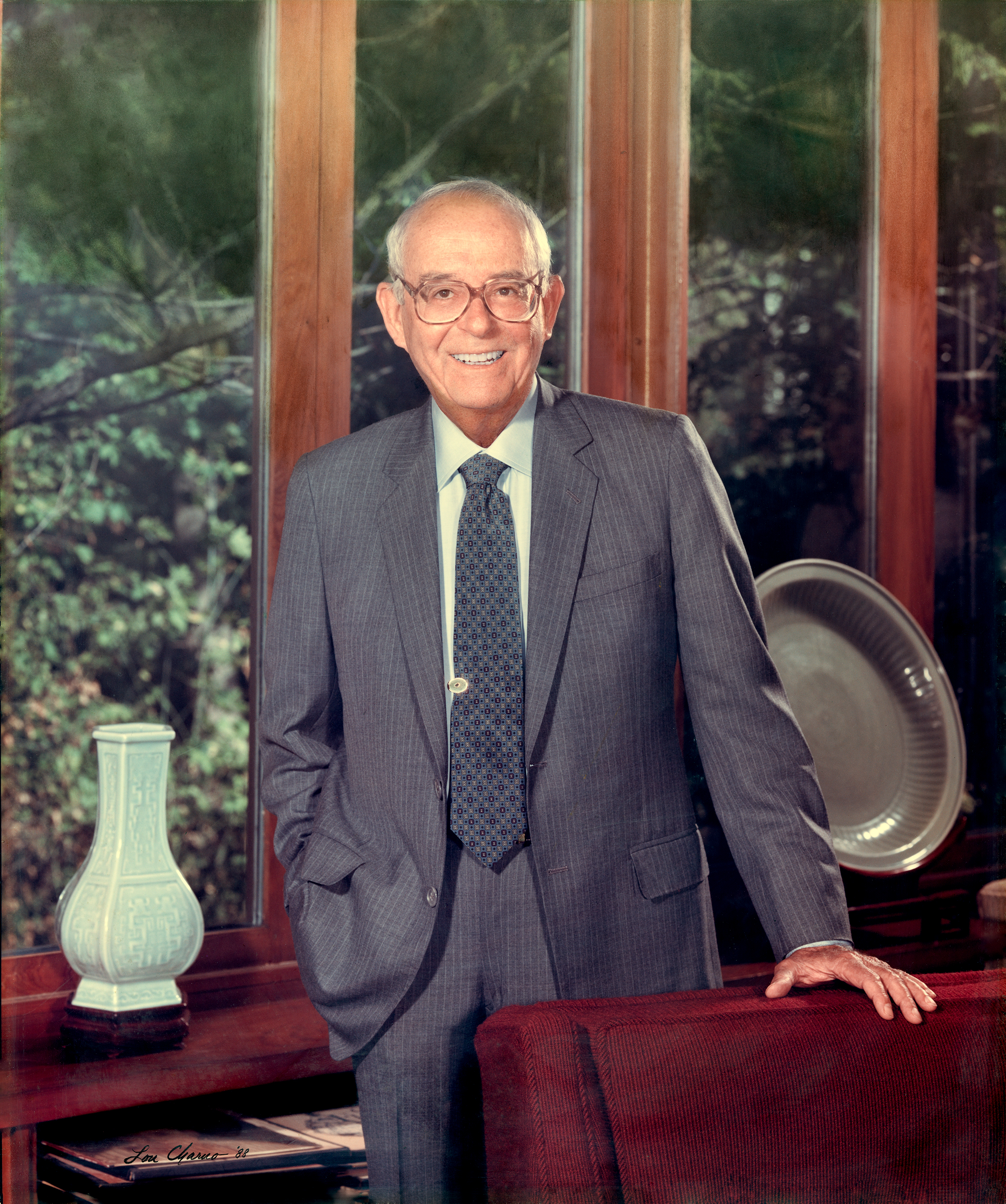
Richard J. Stern (1988)

Richard J. Stern (September 26, 1913 – December 31, 2001) was a Kansas City businessman and philanthropist.

== Family history ==
Stern was the son of Sybil Cohen Stern and Sigmund Stern. His mother was a graduate of Wellesley College. Stern's maternal grandparents were Belle Lehman Cohen and Jacob M. Cohen, who resided in Sioux City, Iowa, before coming to Kansas City in the early 1900s. Sigmund Stern, who was born in Bavaria, was the son of Rosa Feldenheimer Stern and Jacob Stern. With his brothers Morris and Henry, he immigrated to the United States in the late 19th century. Sigmund and Morris worked for a department store in Sioux City prior to founding their own business. Sybil and Sigmund were married in Sioux City in June 1904. Following a honeymoon in Europe, they took up residence in Kansas City, where Sigmund was employed with the real estate firm of Wise & Stern. Sigmund and Morris founded Stern Brothers in 1917.

== Early life and education ==
Stern was born on September 26, 1913, in Kansas City, Missouri. His sister, Judith, who was born on December 25, 1905, was more than seven years his senior. (Years later, she would be a second-generation graduate of Wellesley College.) The Stern family was Jewish, and Sigmund served as a member of the board of trustees of Congregation B'nai Jehudah from 1914 until 1929.

According to the 1920 federal census, the family was then living at 3717 Harrison Street in Kansas City. The three-story house featured a front entrance with columns rising above the second story. By 1930, the Sterns had moved to 236 West 54th Street, a three-story red brick house that was built in 1918.

Stern graduated from the Phillips Academy in Andover, Massachusetts, in 1930. Fencing was his sport both at Andover, (as it was known), and at Yale University. During his junior year at Yale University, Stern was inducted into Phi Beta Kappa. He graduated with honors in 1934. Two years later, Stern earned a master's degree in business administration from Harvard University.

== Career ==
As a young man, Stern joined the Stern Brothers. His work there was interrupted by World War II. Stern served as a captain in the intelligence branch of the Army Air Corps. For a brief period, he wrote the daily newsletter for Button Gwinnett. Following the war, he returned to the family business. His father died on December 31, 1955. Stern then became president of Stern Brothers, with his uncle, Morris, as chairman. Morris died on June 7, 1958. Stern succeeded him as chairman.

The list of companies for which the firm completed securities offerings during Stern's years at the helm includes Rival Manufacturing, Russell Stover Candies, Cook Paint & Varnish, Employers Reinsurance, Gas Service, and Frank Paxton Lumber. In addition, municipal bonds formed a significant part of Stern Brothers business. The Kansas City International Airport, the Harry S Truman Sports Complex (which houses both Arrowhead Stadium, where the Kansas City Chiefs play football, and Kauffman Stadium, where the Kansas City Royals play baseball) and Kemper Arena were among the entities that the firm helped make possible. (Kemper Arena is now the Hy-Vee Arena.)

In 1983, Stern gave an interview to The Independent magazine, in which he stated, "I was always good at arithmetic and I always liked to play games, and this is one big game. I started out working summers as a kid, doing whatever … probably annoying others. Now I make the decisions." Stern Brothers was sold in 1986. Stern retained the title of chairman emeritus until his death in 2001. In Stern's obituary, The Bond Buyer reported, "Local market participants described Mr. Stern as both generous personally, and tough and demanding professionally. When Kansas City was planning to build an overhaul base for TransWorld [sic; Trans World] Airlines, which would have entailed a complex financial transaction, it began by going to Wall Street. As the story goes, the 'large Eastern bond firms got weak knees,' [Leonard] Noah [a retired vice president of operations at Stern Brothers] said. 'Stern Brothers stepped up and did the deal.'" As the Kansas City Star noted, "Although Stern is remembered for working quietly, delegating authority adroitly and seldom closing the double doors to his downtown offices when working on key projects, he also was recalled as [a] forceful man when the occasion required."

== Civic and Philanthropic Activities ==
Many organizations in Kansas City benefited from Stern's time and talents. He was also extremely generous financially.

In 1937, not long after he completed his studies, Stern was listed as a committee member for the Beaux Arts Ball, a benefit for the Kansas City Art Institute. He became a trustee in 1964 and a life trustee in 1988. Stern received an honorary doctorate in fine arts from KCAI at the 1998 commencement ceremony.

Stern's father was a trustee of Kansas City University prior to his death. Stern was elected to that position in 1958. (Kansas City University is now the University of Missouri – Kansas City.) He also served as a member of the board of directors of the Friends of the Library at UMKC when it was founded in the mid-1960s.

In July 1967, there were concerns that Charlie O. Finley was planning to move the Kansas City Athletics to Milwaukee. Stern announced that Stern Brothers was prepared to buy the team. The Kansas City Times quoted him as saying, "We would hope to have broad-based ownership of the club in Kansas City. The purpose of this would be to make sure that the Athletics remain permanently in Kansas City." Nothing came of this offer. Finley moved the Athletics to Oakland, California, in 1968. A new baseball team, the Kansas City Royals, owned by Ewing Kauffman, began playing that year.

"In a cultural vein, Stern goes all out for the Philharmonic," The Independent magazine noted in a 1967 profile. At that time, he was the chairman of the board. In March 1985, it became necessary to make difficult decisions about the Kansas City Philharmonic, which was then 49 years old. Stern was on that committee. After the Philharmonic disbanded, the Kansas City Symphony was created. It was clear that the organization needed to be properly capitalized to avoid the woes that befell its predecessor. A list of pledges and donations from October 1985 included $250,000 from Stern. His was one of the largest gifts. Stern served as one of the 10 founding board members of the Kansas City Symphony, and the only one to have been a board member of the Philharmonic.

During three decades on the board the Lyric Opera of Kansas City, Stern served as vice chairman, president, and treasurer. According to its newsletter, Lyrical Notes, "When the Lyric Opera purchased the Lyric Theatre building in 1991, Stern and foundations under his control provided a majority of the financial support for the purchase." The Lyric Opera had been a tenant in the building, which was then owned by the Hearst Corporation, until structural issues forced the organization to move to the Music Hall, which proved to be a temporary solution. The Kansas City Star reported that the building cost $2.65 million, with an additional $406,000 for roof repair. The newspaper listed the donors as "Richard J. Stern, the Hall Family Foundation of Kansas, Yellow Freight Systems, the William T. Kemper Foundation-Commerce Bank Trustee, Jules and Doris Stein Foundation, H. Tony Oppenheimer, and United Telecommunications Foundation." Stern's interests ranged far beyond finance and management; he also had a tremendous fondness for the operettas of Gilbert & Sullivan. His preferred seat was in the middle of the third row, and he generally attended the Monday and Wednesday performances.

In 1992, Stern was honored, along with Adele Hall, Estelle Sosland, Jerry Berkowitz, and Robert P. Lyons, for service to the Kansas City chapter of Young Audiences. At that time, the organization was celebrating its 30th anniversary.

== Additional honors ==
Stern received a Missouri Arts Award from the Missouri Arts Council in 1992. According to the council's website, "[the] annual Missouri Arts Awards celebrate people, organizations, and communities that have made profound and lasting contributions to the cultural and artistic climate of the state."

In 2001, Stern was one of the 175 people whose contributions to the area were recognized on the Legacy List for Jackson County, Missouri. The number 175 was chosen because Jackson County had been founded in 1826, which was 175 years earlier. The honorees included men and women who were prominent in many different fields and who made a difference in the community in the 19th and 20th centuries. Among them were Lucille Bluford, the publisher of the Kansas City Call; Walt Disney, the creator of Mickey Mouse; George Kessler, who designed the parks and boulevards system for Kansas City; Charlie Parker, the jazz musician; and Harry S. Truman, former president.

== Personal life ==
Stern's interests included modern architecture. His parents were still living at the house on West 54th Street at the time of his father's death. By then, Stern was residing at 725 West 49th Terrace. The house, which had been built for him, was notable for the use of aluminum in its exterior and for its many windows. He sold it in 1963 and purchased the Sondern House at 3600 Belleview Avenue, which had been designed by Frank Lloyd Wright in the late 1930s, with a substantial addition by the architect circa 1950. Stern was the third owner. He did some renovations, and occupied the house until his death. Near the end of Stern's life, Jim Blair, a friend and former bond trader at Stern Brothers, lived in the house with him. Stern had donated the house to The Nelson-Atkins Museum of Art, but maintained a life interest in it. After his death, the museum sold the house to Blair.

Travel was an important part of Stern's life, with Europe and the Caribbean Islands as preferred destinations. He spent much time in Venice, Italy, and on the island of Capri in the summers and in St. Martin in the winter. Just as he returned often to places he loved, he had several restaurants where he was a regular: the Savoy, in Kansas City, and Harry's Bar, in Venice.

Stern died on December 31, 2001, at his home in Kansas City. He was 88 years old. His death occurred 46 years to the day after the death of his father.

== Legacy ==
Stern was predeceased by both of his parents, (his mother died in 1961), and by his sister, who died in May 2001. His survivors included a niece and a nephew. The Richard J. Stern Foundation for the Arts has continued his charitable giving in the years since his death.

At the time of his death, Stern had been a Lyric Opera board member for approximately two-thirds of its 44-year history. On Stern's death, Evan Luskin, then the general director of the Lyric Opera, was quoted as saying, "In so many ways, he's been Mr. Lyric Opera." The production of Don Pasquale in the spring of 2002 was dedicated to him, as was the entire 2002–2003 season. Nearly a decade after Stern's death, the Richard J. Stern Opera Center, the headquarters of the Lyric Opera, opened in the Crossroads District. In 2021, the center includes the Beth Ingram Administration Building and the Ginger and Michael Frost Production Arts Building.

The Richard J. Stern Ceramics Building at the Kansas City Art Institute received an award from the American Institute of Architects in 2002. The building was designed by Gould Evans Goodman Associates and erected by McCown Gordon Construction.

The University of Missouri – Kansas City has a Richard J. Stern Foundation for the Arts Scholarship for Theatre, which is awarded to graduate students who are majoring in costume design.

Faculty members at Phillips Academy Andover are eligible to receive the Richard J. Stern Instructorship.

In recent years, the Richard J. Stern Foundation for the Arts has been a catalyst for the projects of a variety of organizations, in addition to the ones with which he was associated. These include (but are not limited to) ArtsKC Regional Arts Council, Charlotte Street Foundation, The Folly Theater, the Kansas City Ballet, Kansas City PBS, the Kansas City Repertory Theatre, the Mid-America Arts Alliance, The Nelson-Atkins Museum of Art, Spinning Tree Theatre, the Spire Chamber Ensemble, and the Unicorn Theatre. The foundation's current assets are reported to be in excess of $64 million.
