= Sterne =

Sterne may refer to

- Sterne (surname)
- Laurence Sterne (1713–1768), Anglo-Irish novelist
- Sterne, original title of Stars, film directed by Konrad Wolf
- Sterne or Die Sterne, band from Germany
- Sterne, 1960 Czech film about the assassination of Reinhard Heydrich
