= Elijah Baker (preacher) =

American Baptist minister (1742–1798)

- Born: 1742; Orange or Lunenberg County, Colony of Virginia, British America
- Died: November 6, 1798 (aged 55–56); Salisbury, Somerset County, Maryland, United States
- Occupation: Baptist minister
- Known for: Preaching and church planter in Maryland and Virginia between 1776 and 1798
- Spouse(s): Sarah Copeland, Ann Widgeon
- Children: Elijah Baker

Elijah Baker (1742 - November 06, 1798) was an American Baptist minister who preached in Virginia and Maryland. He is known to have preached in Henrico, James City, Charles City, and York Counties before traveling Gloucester County and ultimately founding numerous churches on the Eastern Shore of Virginia and Maryland. Elijah Baker's conversion and ordination is credited to Rev. Shubal Stearns of Sandy Creek Baptist Church in Sandy Creek, North Carolina. Baker is credited with planting the following churches:

- James City Baptist Church, 1773
- Charles City Baptist Church, 1776
- Grafton Baptist Church, 1777
- Lower Northampton Baptist Church, 1778
- Mesongoes Baptist Church, 1779
- Hungo's Baptist Church, 1783
- Matompkin Baptist Church, 1785
- Chincoteague Baptist Church, 1786
- Seacock Baptist Church, 1787
- Portsmouth Baptist Church, 1789
- Pungoteague Baptist Church, 1790
- Machipongo Baptist Church
- Boars Swamp Baptist Church
- Four Mile Baptist Church

Baker was jailed for preaching for 56 days in Accomack County in 1778, one of the last ministers to be jailed in Virginia for opposing the state-sponsored Anglican church.
