= Carl Leo Stearns =

American astronomer

Carl Leo Stearns (1892 – November 28, 1972) was an American astronomer.

After graduating from Wesleyan University in 1917 with high honors in general scholarship and special honors in mathematics, Stearns received his PhD from Yale University. He became an instructor in mathematics and astronomy at Wesleyan in 1919. He became an assistant professor in 1920, then an associate professor in 1942 and a full professor in 1944. He served as chairman of the astronomy department at Wesleyan, then in 1960 he was named as emeritus Fisk professor of astronomy. From 1960–71, after serving as an assistant, he became director of the Van Vleck Observatory; the second to hold that position.

During his career he computed more than 200 stellar trigonometric parallaxes. In 1927 he discovered the comet 1927 IV (1927d), now known as C/1927 E1 (Stearns). It was observed for 4 years after perihelion until 1931 at a record distance of 11.5 AU. It is difficult to explain its activity based on water-dominated ice.

2035 Stearns, a Mars-crossing asteroid was named after him, as is the crater Stearns on the far side of the Moon.
