= Van Vleck Observatory =

Observatory in Connecticut, US

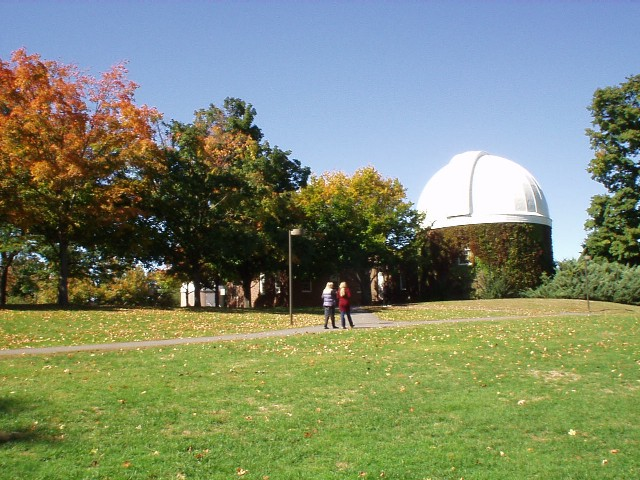
- Van Vleck Observatory
- Organization: Wesleyan University
- Observatory code: 298
- Location: Middletown, Connecticut
- Coordinates: 41°33′18″N 72°39′33″W
- Altitude: 65 meters (213 ft)
- Established: 1914
- Website: Van Vleck Observatory

Telescopes
- Perkin Telescope: 0.6 m reflector
- Alvan Clark Great Refractor: 0.5 m refractor
- Meade LX200GPS Schmidt-Cassegrain: 0.4 m reflector
- Related media on Commons

Van Vleck Observatory (VVO, IAU code 298) is an astronomical observatory owned and operated by Wesleyan University. It was built in 1914 and named after the former head of the Department of Mathematics and Astronomy at the university, Prof. John M. Van Vleck. It is located in Middletown, Connecticut (USA).

This has a surviving Great refractor, a long telescope with lens popular in the late 1800s, as well as some other telescopes.

== Telescopes ==
The University owns three telescopes. A 16-inch (410 mm) and a 20-inch (510 mm) are both used for weekly public observing nights, open to the Wesleyan community and the general public. The third telescope, the 24-inch (610 mm) Perkins Telescope, is used primarily for research, including for senior and graduate student thesis projects, as well as for departmental research programs. The Perkins scope is one of the largest telescopes in New England. Wesleyan participates in a consortium of universities that operate the WIYN .9-meter telescope at the Kitt Peak National Observatory in Arizona. Students (undergraduate and graduate) and faculty have the opportunity to spend time in Arizona doing research with the telescope. Wesleyan also is a member of the Keck Northeast Astronomy Consortium (KNAC).

A 6 inch aperture refractor was acquired by Wesleyan University in 1836, and this was the largest telescope in the United States until at least 1840. The telescope was moved into the collection of the Van Vleck observatory in the 20th century.

== Directors ==
- Frederick Slocum, 1915–44
- Carl Leo Stearns, 1944–60
- Thornton Leigh Page, 1960–71
- Arthur R. Upgren, 1973–93
- William Herbst, 1993–99
- John Salzer, 1999–2004
- William Herbst, 2004–2021
- Edward C. Moran, 2021-

== See also ==
- List of astronomical observatories
