= Stern's Pickle Works =

Pickle factory in Farmingdale, New York, U.S.

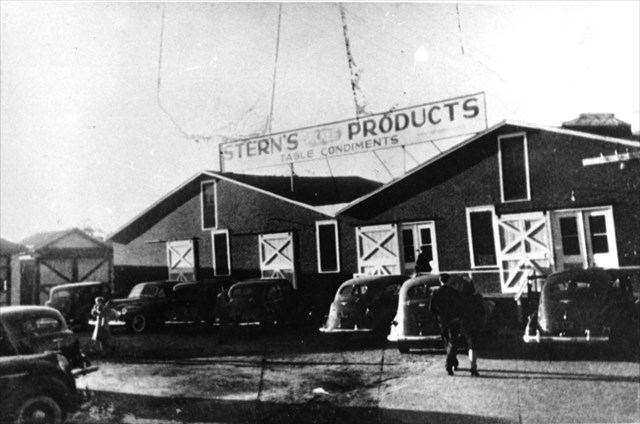

Stern's Pickle Works, headquartered at 111 Powell Place off Melville Road in Farmingdale, New York, was the last remaining pickle factory on Long Island from the 19th century.

== History ==
In 1888, Jarvis Andrew Lattin (1853–1941) started a pickle and sauerkraut factory in Farmingdale, New York. There were many pickling companies already established in the area. He had a house built on the land next to the factory. The factory in 1894 was sold to Aaron Stern and it became the "Stern and Lattin Pickle Company" and in 1914 "Stern and Brauner". It was also listed as "Stern Pickle Products, Inc." and "Stern's Pickle Works". It was at 111 Powell Place off Melville Road and lasted until 1985.

== Aaron Stern (1876-1952) ==
He went to the US in 1893 from Austria and was naturalized in 1898. He married Anna (1889-1933) in 1910 and had the following children: Sidney Stern (1915–2008); Nathan Stern; Joseph Stern (1909-1996); Hilda Stern; and Edythe Stern (1918-2016). Aaron was living in Brooklyn.

== Names ==
- Lattin Pickle company (c1888)
- Stern and Lattin Pickle Company (c1894)
- Stern and Brauner
- Stern Pickle Products, Inc. (c1894-1985) and Stern's Pickle Works
