= R. H. Stearns =

American businessman and politician (1824–1909)

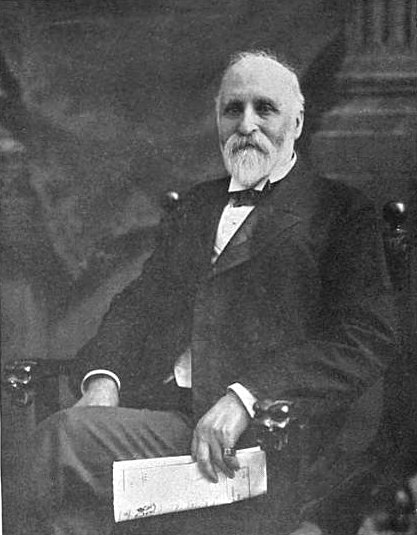

Richard Hall Stearns (December 25, 1824 – August 1909) was an American businessman and politician who operated R. H. Stearns and Company. Its headquarters and main store—R. H. Stearns Building on Tremont Street, Boston—is a United States Historic Place.

== Early life ==
Stearns was born on December 25, 1824, in Ashburnham, Massachusetts.

Soon after his birth his family moved to New Ipswich, New Hampshire. At the age of seven, he was left an orphan and taken in and raised by his uncle on a farm in Lincoln, Massachusetts; from that age he earned his room and board with farmwork.

He was educated in district schools and attended Phillips Academy in Andover, Massachusetts for one year. After his studies, he taught school.

== R. H. Stearns and Company ==
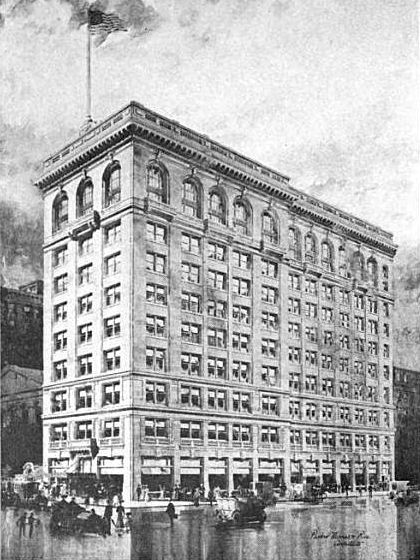
R.H. Stearns & Co., Tremont Street, Boston, 1914

In 1846, Stearns moved to Boston and worked in the store of C.C. Burr. A year later, Stearns opened up his own business in a small shop which later grew into a large store and Company, R. H. Stearns and Company.

R. H. Stearns and Company became a fixture in the downtown Boston shopping scene for over a century, and also opened a few branch stores in the greater Boston area. The store catered to the "carriage trade" (well-off customers) and was particularly noted for its woman's clothing, the stereotypical Stearns customer being a white-gloved older woman of subdued upper-crust demeanor, although well-crafted children's items were also sold, as well as men's clothing, silver and crystal – but not appliances.

In the early 1920s, R. H. Stearns and Company was bought by James Nelson and Bob Maynard. In the mid 20th century, Carl N. Schmalz (1898-1979), son of a general store owner in Huntley, Illinois, was president and later board chairman; Schmalz arranged the sale of the company to Edward Goodman, former president of Abraham & Straus, in 1975. The business closed in 1978.

By the mid-1970s the changing face of the retail marketplace caught up with the store, and it did not have the financial backing like Filene's or Jordan Marsh, who were both owned by large national retail holding companies. At the time of Stearn's demise Filene's was owned by Federated Department Stores, and Jordan Marsh was owned by Allied Stores.

R. H. Stearns and Co. filed for bankruptcy and closed all stores in 1977.

== Personal life and public service ==
Stearns served in the Massachusetts Legislature for two years and also on the Boston Educational Board.

Stearns married Louise M. Waterman. His sons Frank Waterman Stearns and Richard Hall Stearns, Jr. (b. April 25, 1862) were members of R. H. Stearns and Company after R. H. Stearns's death. Another son, William Foster Stearns (b. April 18, 1859;) was an 1882 graduate of Amherst College and a Congregational clergyman. There was another son, Frederick R. Stearns.

Stearns died in August 1909, in Poland Springs, Maine, aged 85.

== See also ==
- 1874 Massachusetts legislature
- 1875 Massachusetts legislature
