= Zdounky =

- Municipality
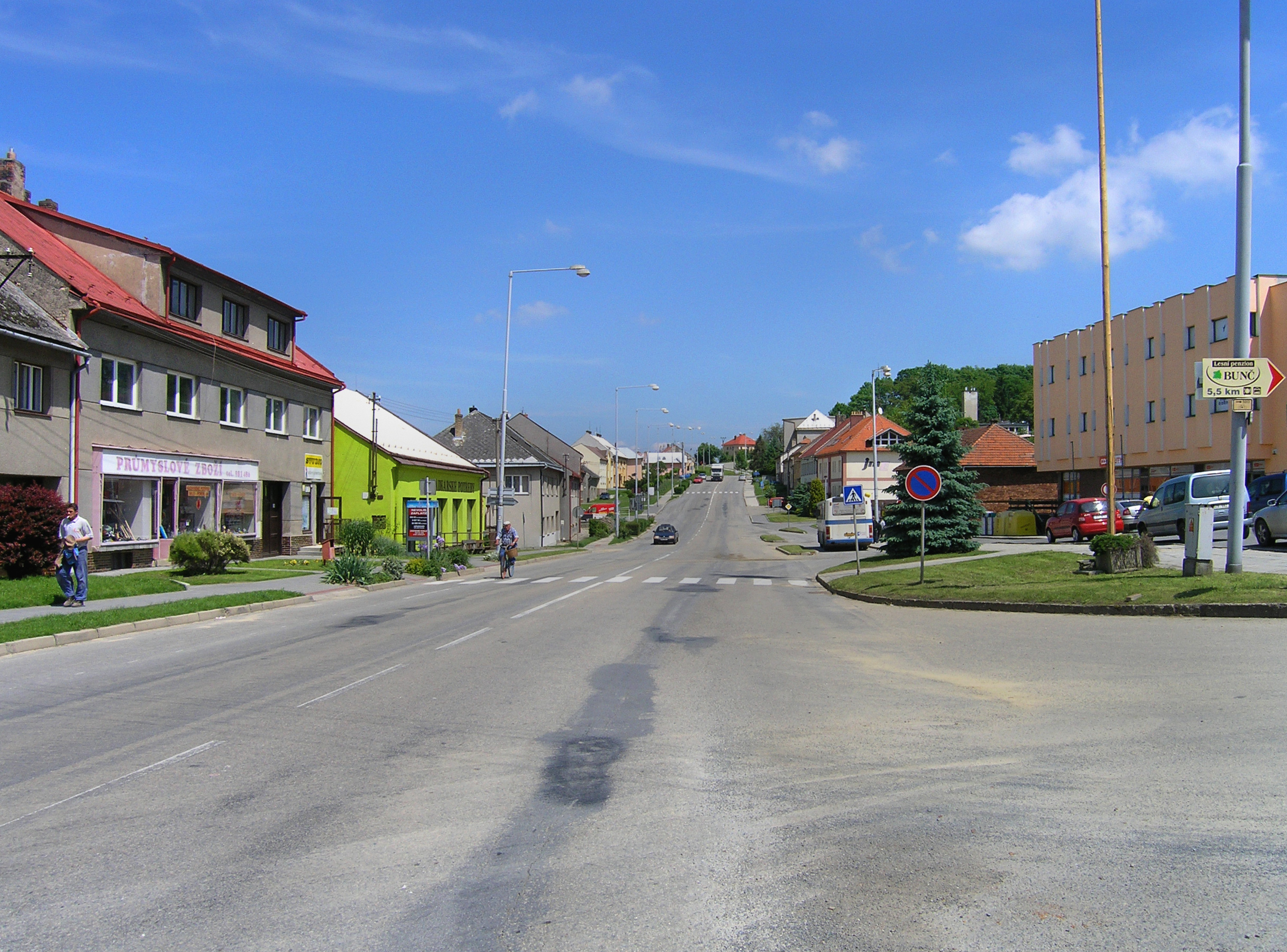
- Centre of Zdounky

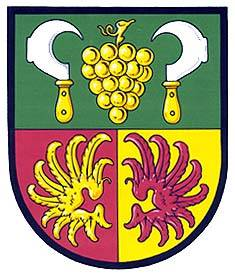
- Flag Coat of arms

- Location in the Czech Republic
- Coordinates: 49°13′40″N 17°19′8″E
- Country: Czech Republic
- Region: Zlín
- District: Kroměříž
- First mentioned: 1298

Area
  - Total: 26.62 km^{2} (10.28 sq mi)
- Elevation: 237 m (778 ft)

Population (2026-01-01)
  - Total: 2,082
  - Density: 78.21/km^{2} (202.6/sq mi)
- Time zone: UTC+1 (CET)
  - Summer (DST): UTC+2 (CEST)
- Postal code: 768 02
- Website: www.zdounky.cz

Zdounky is a municipality and village in Kroměříž District in the Zlín Region of the Czech Republic. It has about 2,100 inhabitants.

== Administrative division ==
Zdounky consists of six municipal parts (in brackets population according to the 2021 census):

- Zdounky (1,313)
- Cvrčovice (142)
- Divoky (124)
- Lebedov (17)
- Nětčice (231)
- Těšánky (143)

== Etymology ==
There are several theories about the origin of the name. Either it was derived from the personal names Vzdún or Zdúnek, or from an old word for a potter (zdún).

== Geography ==
Zdounky is located about 9 kilometres (6 mi) southwest of Kroměříž and 24 km (15 mi) west of Zlín. Most of the municipal trerritory lies in the Litenčice Hills, only the southern part lies in the Chřiby range. The highest point is the hill Na Kopě at 422 metres (1,385 ft) above sea level.

== History ==
The first written mention of Zdounky is from 1298. From 1358, Zdounky was referred to as a market town, but throughout its history its economic and political importance was only local. In 1423, during the Hussite Wars, Zdounky was ravaged by the Hussites. Among the most notable owners of Zdounky were the Zierotin family (in 1523–1542), the Jesuits (in 1635–1784) and the Counts of Lamberg (in 1806–1889).

== Demographics ==
Historical population

Year	Pop.	±%
1869	2,269	—
1880	2,560	+12.8%
1890	2,631	+2.8%
1900	2,705	+2.8%
1910	2,819	+4.2%

Year	Pop.	±%
1921	2,855	+1.3%
1930	2,756	−3.5%
1950	2,464	−10.6%
1961	2,470	+0.2%
1970	2,312	−6.4%

Year	Pop.	±%
1980	2,231	−3.5%
1991	2,177	−2.4%
2001	2,031	−6.7%
2011	2,030	−0.0%
2021	1,970	−3.0%

Source: Censuses

== Transport ==
Zdounky is located on the railway line Bystřice pod Hostýnem–Zborovice via Kroměříž.

== Sights ==
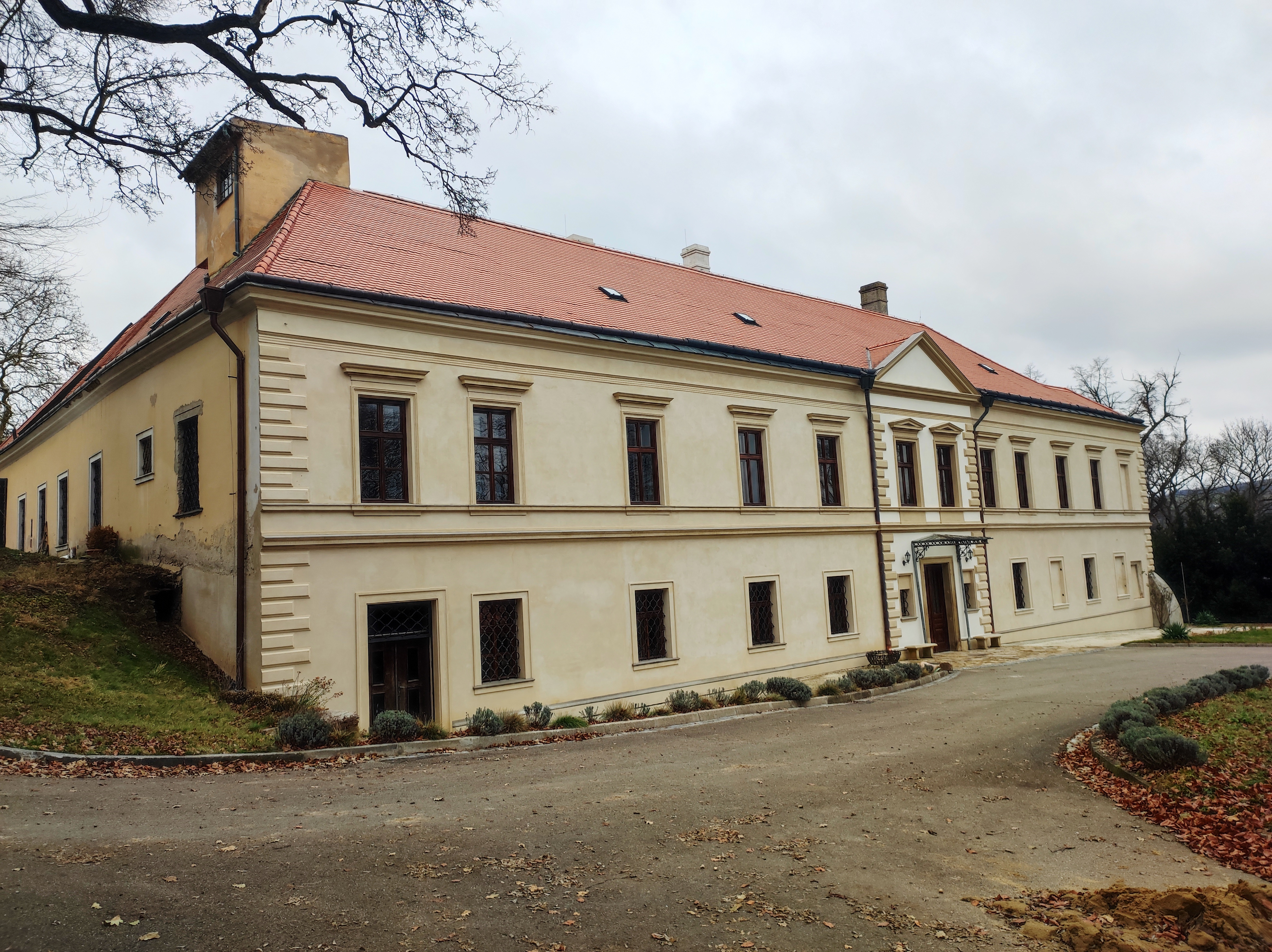
Zdounky Castle

The main landmarks of Zdounky are the church and the castle. The Church of the Holy Trinity was originally a Gothic building, first documented in 1366. The Renaissance tower was added in 1570. In the 18th century, the church was rebuilt several times.

The Zdounky Castle was built in the Renaissance style in the 17th century on the site of a fortress from the 14th century. Next to the castle is a Baroque granary and a castle park. Today the castle is privately owned.
