= Jarohněvice =

- Municipality
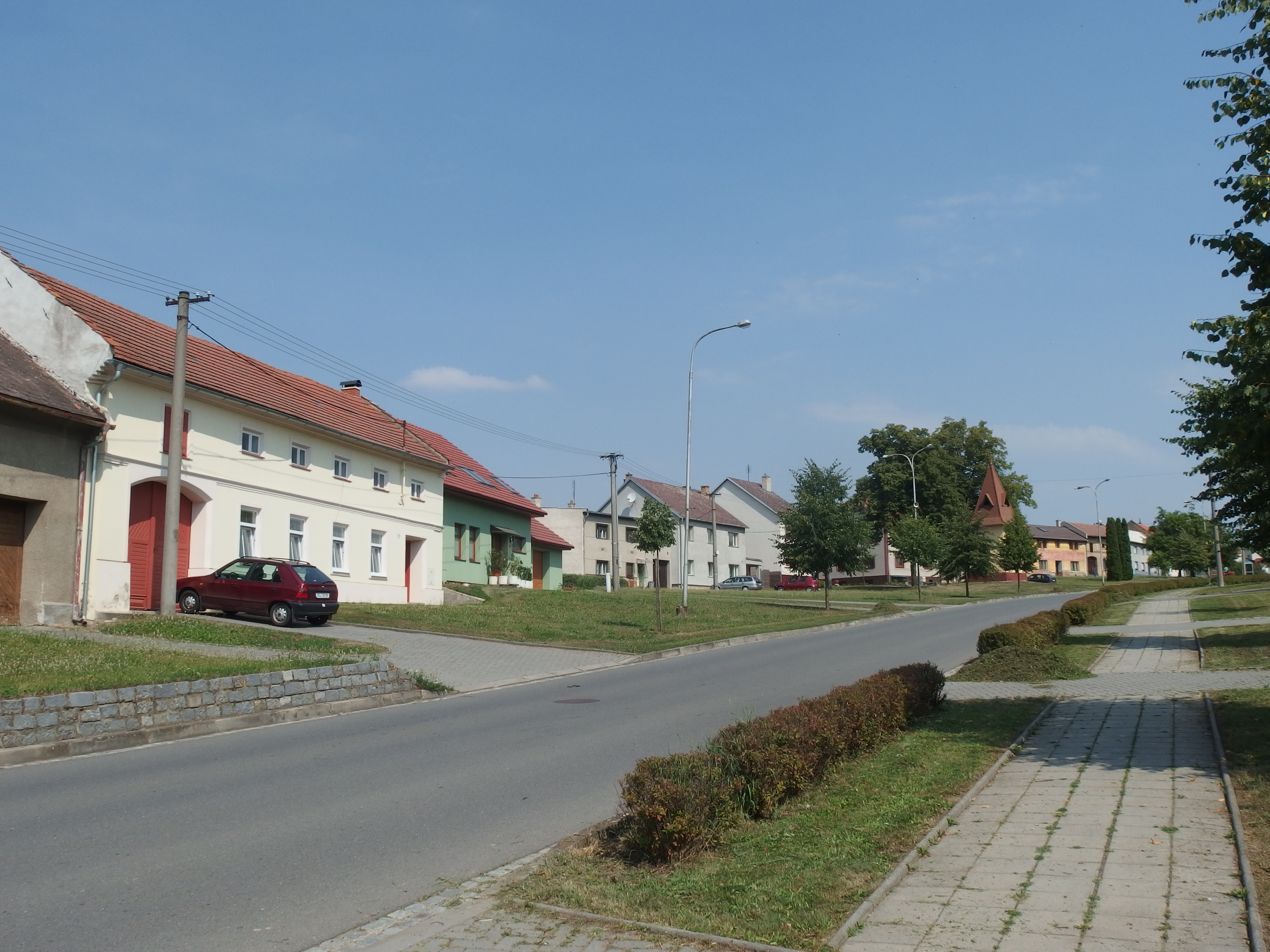
- Centre of Jarohněvice

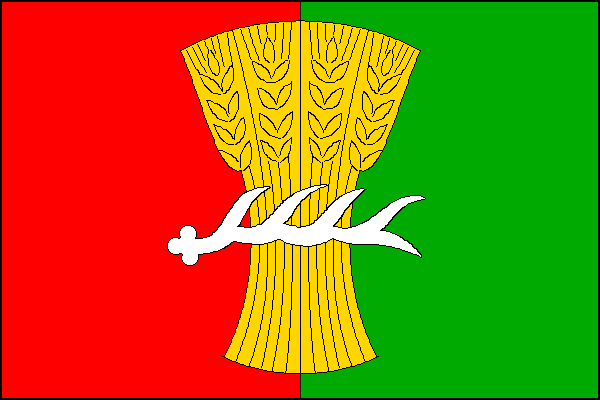
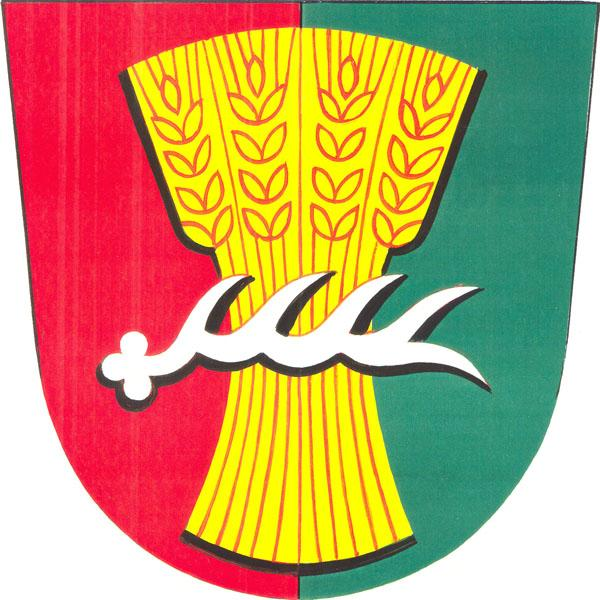
- Flag Coat of arms

- Location in the Czech Republic
- Coordinates: 49°16′2″N 17°22′39″E
- Country: Czech Republic
- Region: Zlín
- District: Kroměříž
- First mentioned: 1267

Area
  - Total: 4.99 km^{2} (1.93 sq mi)
- Elevation: 207 m (679 ft)

Population (2026-01-01)
  - Total: 320
  - Density: 64/km^{2} (170/sq mi)
- Time zone: UTC+1 (CET)
  - Summer (DST): UTC+2 (CEST)
- Postal code: 768 01
- Website: www.jarohnevice.eu

Jarohněvice is a municipality and village in Kroměříž District in the Zlín Region of the Czech Republic. It has about 300 inhabitants.

Jarohněvice lies approximately 5 kilometres (3 mi) south-west of Kroměříž, 23 km (14 mi) west of Zlín, and 231 km (144 mi) south-east of Prague.

== Demographics ==
Historical population
Year	Pop.	±%
1869	380	—
1880	421	+10.8%
1890	418	−0.7%
1900	440	+5.3%
1910	453	+3.0%
1921	422	−6.8%
1930	386	−8.5%
1950	294	−23.8%
1961	300	+2.0%
1970	267	−11.0%
1980	225	−15.7%
1991	208	−7.6%
2001	231	+11.1%
2011	311	+34.6%
2021	306	−1.6%
Source: Censuses
