= Milan Pitlach =

Czech architect and photographer

Milan Pitlach (1 March 1943, Kroměříž, Czech Republic – 31 August 2021, Düsseldorf, Germany) was a Czech architect and photographer.

== Biography and career ==
After attending school in Opava, Milan Pitlach studied at the Faculty of Architecture of the Czech Technical University in Prague. Following this he worked from 1966 till 1969 in Studio Delta of the Union of Architectural Studios (Sdružení projektových atelierů) in Prague. During 1969–1970 he had an internship with Yorke, Rosenberg & Mardall in London. After his return to Prague he was again employed by Studio Delta with the Design Institute of Prague /PÙ VHMP/. In 1981 he immigrated to the German Federal Republic, where he settled in Düsseldorf. There he worked first with Dansard, Kalenborn & Partner, Heuser Architects, between 1984–1989 and then in the office of O. M. Ungers in Cologne. From 2003 till 2009 he lived in Shanghai, working as a chief architect of Archlong Group Co. He ran an office in Düsseldorf.

It was during his internship in London that Milan Pitlach began taking photographs. His first photographic exhibition was held in Reduta Club in Prague in 1972. Since that he has had some forty individual exhibitions, taken part in many group exhibitions and published his photographic work in a series of books and catalogs.

== Architectural work ==
Milan Pitlach's architectural language derives from the tradition of modern Czech architecture. “The main premises of my designs are economy of volume, but also of layout and an effort to create space. Concepts are based on elementary volumes, which, however much they may be distorted, leave a sense of their original shape.” (Milan Pitlach: Introduction to the book Shanghai Concepts). Pitlach avoids formal subjectivism, which manifests itself through pretentious gestures and ornaments of different kinds. From the outset Pitlach has concentrated on the design much more than the planning of works. During the four decades of his professional career he has developed very many concepts; in Czechoslovakia, Great Britain, Germany or China. These concepts are not only architectural but also large scale urban schemes. (After all, he graduated from Professor Krises's town-planning department of CVUT). Pitlach has reflected on his attitude to architecture in several critical essays, for example in Architektura CSR and Architekt, as well as Revolver Revue and its Critical Supplement. He has also taught as a visiting professor at Bergische Universität in Wuppertal (1984–1985) and at his alma mater, The Czech Technical University in Prague (1992–1993).

=== Architectural work (selected projects) ===
- 1968 – New South-West Town, Prague, competition entry
- 1968 – Embassy of ČSR, Stockholm, competition entry
- 1971 – Recreation Centre of Trade Unions, Staré Splavy, design
- 1975 – New Satellite Town Lipence, Prague, master plan
- 1975 – Family House, Bílovec
- 1975 – Exhibition of Jan Svoboda, Brno, Moravská galerie, design
- 1977 – Flats for Teachers of School for Children of Foreigner Residents, Prague
- 1978 – Residential Unit in Prague - Střešovice
- 1978 – Family House, Ostrava – Dobroslavice
- 1980 – Headquarters of the Federal Statistic Agency, Prague, design
- 1985 – Federal Court, Karlsruhe (for the studio of O.M. Ungers)
- 1986 – Progetto Biccoca, Milan (for the studio of O.M. Ungers)
- 1986 – Kunstahalle Düsseldorf, competition entry (for the studio of O.M. Ungers)
- 1987 – Messepalast Vienna, competition entry (for the studio of O.M. Ungers)
- 1987 – Mediapark Cologne, competition entry (for the studio of O.M. Ungers)
- 1988 – Fortrezza di Basso, Firenze, concept (for the studio of O.M. Ungers)
- 1989 – Administrative Building BIBA, Bremen (for the studio of O.M. Ungers)
- 1992 – Apprentice School of Bayer Comp., Uerdingen
- 1993 – Central Railway Station Administrative and Congress Center, Prague, competition entry
- 1994 – City Passage, Herne
- 1995 – Remodelling of Old Town Square, Třebíč, competition entry
- 2000 – Alteration of Laboratories of BAYER Comp., Wuppertal
- 2003 – villa Bethanienturm, Berlin, design
- 2003 – JMS Office Building, Shanghai, competition entry
- 2004 – South Club on MJN - Island, Tianjin, design
- 2004 – Administrative Building Block #114, Jing An District, Shanghai, design
- 2004 – International Art Centre, Shanghai
- 2004 – Shanghai Jewish Memorial, Shanghai, competition entry
- 2005 – Extension of Hongqiao Airport and Railway Station, Shanghai, competition entry
- 2005 – Greenland Restaurant, Shanghai, design
- 2006 – New City Centre, Changqing, design
- 2007 – East Tai Hu Lake Development Plan, Suzhou, competition entry
- 2008 – Residential District, Taohuajie, design
- 2010 – Apartment House Mirbachplatz, Berlin, design

=== Awards ===
Of several of his projects and competition entries, some have been awarded the highest prize: Master Plan of Traffic Flow of Prague-Liben (1980), Kunsthalle Düsseldorf (1986), Messepalast Vienna (ex equo 1987), Mediapark Cologne (ex equo 1987), Administrative Building BIBA Bremen (1989), Modification of Karlovo Square, Třebíč (1996), Administrative Building Block #114, Jing An District, Shanghai (2004), Shanghai Jewish Memorial, Shanghai (2004), Cultural Zone Min Hang, Shanghai (2005), East Tai Hu Lake Development Plan, Suzhou (2007). Among other prize-winning projects were: New South-West Town, Prague (1968), Playgrounds for Children (1971), Extension of the Town Library, Fulda (1986), Residential Ensemble, Solingen (1990), Central Railway Station Administrative and Congress Center, Prague (1993), Station of Suspended Railway, Wuppertal (1993), Master Plan of Industrial Zone, Schweinfurt (1995), Modification of Komenský and Masaryk Square, Třebíč (1996).

=== Exhibitions ===
- 2004 – Artsea Gallery, Shanghai, Shanghai Jewish Memorial
- 2012 – House of Arts, Cabinet of Architecture /GVUO/ Ostrava, Shanghai Concepts
- 2012 – Industrial Gallery, Ostrava, Sketches
- 2012 – House of Arts, OKO Opava, 3 x Milan Pitlach / Shanghai works

== Photographic work ==
London in 1969 made Milan Pitlach a photographer. “He was fascinated by the new subject-matter and the evidence of a life-style which he empathised with and admired and which he quickly adopted. And because it seemed to him very significant, he wanted to record it. … He did this in photographs and diaries, both forms of expression; because more than an abstract and professional approach to reality we find here an attitude of somebody who wants and must both visually and literally give an account of an important personal experience, perhaps a key event of his life.” On his return to Czechoslovakia he continued taking photographs as a document of the gloomy Czech reality of the Husak period. A similar motivation and aesthetic marks the work produced on the travels he made during that decade (Poland, East Germany, Soviet Union). At that time he developed a subjective line, portraying the “small” world around him. These pictures were exhibited at Dokumenta 1997 and published in a book with the title Deníky / Diaries. Since his emigration to West Germany (1981) he has enjoyed the possibility of free movement, and this has resulted in an intensification of his photographic activities. In his work of the Eighties, a period marked by many journeys (France, Italy, Japan, USA), the most extensive collection of photographs is from India. “In his photographs from India, which he made ten years after his English photographs we encounter formal virtuosity. Pitlach balances his compositions with professional certainty and elegance… He treats the counterpoint of light and shadow almost in the manner of the masters of the Baroque.” (Helena Honcoopová – Photographs from India, Catalogue of an exhibition, National Gallery Prague). The last of Pitlach’s major themes has been China, where he spent six years working as an architect. Recently a more elegiac and contemplative style has characterized much of his photographic output. One example is The Gospel According to Matthew, which was exhibited in the National Library in Prague (2001) and appeared as a book in 2004; other various collections have been published, for example Landscapes According to Friedrich Nietzsche, Fragments, Calligraphies and Gaspar de la Nuit.

=== Exhibitions (selected) ===
- 1972 – Reduta, Prague, Ostrov / The Island
- 1976 – Moravian Gallery, Brno, Londýnský deník / London Diary (exhibition was forbidden by authorities)
- 1977 – Gallery Creative Camera, London, London Diary
- 1983 – Gallery Porta Dromedaris, Enkhuisen, Photographs from Czechoslovakia
- 1984 – Gallery K, Tokyo, Footnotes
- 1992 – Galerie Manes, Prague, Czech Photography in Exile
- 1994 – Galerie Fronta, Prague, Milan Pitlach
- 1997 – Interkamera, Prague, Deníky / Diaries
- 2000 – Národní galerie, Prague, Fotografie z Indie / Photographs from India
- 2000 – Czech Cultural Centre, Dresden, Photographs from Czechoslovakia of the Seventies
- 2000 – Tanzhaus NRW, Düsseldorf, Tänze des Alltags / About Dance
- 2000 – Gallery Obecní dům, Prague, Museum Helsinki, We 1948-1989 (Exhibition of Moravian Gallery, Brno)
- 2001 – Moravian Gallery, Brno, Londýnský deník / London Diary
- 2001 – National Library, Prague, Evangelium podle Matouše / Gospel According to Matthew
- 2002 – British Council, Prague, Londýnský deník / London Diary
- 2003 – Gallery Werkstat, Blankenheim, Fragments
- 2003 – Artsea Gallery, Shanghai, Four Foreigner Photographers
- 2004 – Artsea Gallery, Shanghai, Eyes Wide
- 2005 – Arts and Crafts Museum, Prague, Česká fotografie 20. století / Czech Photography of 20th Century
- 2008 – National Gallery Prague, Calligraphy
- 2008 – Moravian Gallery, Brno, Třetí strana zdi / Third side of the Wall (Exhibition of Moravian Gallery)
- 2010 – Gallery Fiducia, Ostrava, Sůl země / Fotografie z Ostravy / Salt of the Earth
- 2012 – Museum of Town Ostrava, Ostrava, Kaligrafie / Calligraphy
- 2013 – Industrial Gallery, Ostrava, Kašpar noci podle Ravela / Gaspard de la Nuit d´après Ravel
- 2013 – House of Arts, Cabinet of Architecture /GVUO/ Ostrava, Le Corbusier - Chandigarh

== Bibliography ==
=== Architectural work ===
- Architektura 7/68, New South-West Town, Prague
- Architektura 10/71, Playgrounds for Children, Prague
- PU VHMP, Annual Report 1972, Recreation Centre of Trade Unions, Staré Splavy
- Casabella, 524/1986, Projetto Bicocca, Milan
- Domus, 377/1986, Projetto Bicocca, Milan
- Casabella, 536/1987, Urban Park, Salemi
- Casabella, 544/1988, Messepalast, Vienna
- Casabella, 546/1988, Mediapark, Cologne
- Architekt, 10/92, 1992 Apprentice School of Bayer Comp., Uerdingen
- Projekt, 4/92, Town hall, Lage / Lippe
- Fassade, 1/1994, Apprentice School of Bayer Comp., Uerdingen
- New Encyclopaedia of Czech Visual Artists, 1995
- Revolver Revue, 50/2002, Space in Architecture
- Kritická příloha RR 28/2004, Walk through the Castle of Prague
- Vision 1/2005, CN, Shanghai Jewish Memorial
- Milan Pitlach: Shanghai Concepts, a publication of Archlog Group Co., Shanghai 2009
- Architekt 1/2011, Shanghai Jewish Memorial

Many works have been shown at exhibitions of projects and competition entries and published in architectural magazines such as Wettbewerb Actuell, Baumeister, Architekt, Architektura, Project.

=== Photographic work ===
- 1973 Revue Fotografie 3/1973, London Diary
- 1999 Revolver Revue 40, Messages
- 2001 Revolver Revue 44, Photographs from Czechoslovakia of the Seventies
- 2003 Revolver Revue 51, Practical Hydrology /with Prokop Voskovec/
- 2004 Revolver Revue 56, Landscapes according to Friedrich Nietzsche
- 2004 Vision Magazine, CN, 8/2004, Eyes Wide
- 2005 Vision Magazine, CN, 5/2005, Milan Pitlach / The Art of Seeing
- 2007 Revolver Revue 65, Imaginary Portraits
- 2009 Revolver Revue 77, Calligraph

=== Books and Catalogues – Photographic work ===
- Momentaufnahme, W.H.Thesing, Wuppertal 1997
- Deníky / Diaries, TORST, Prague 1999, ISBN 80-7215-080-4
- Fotografie z Indie / Photographs from India, catalogue of National Gallery, Prague 2000, ISBN 80-7035-223-X
- Milan Pitlach, FOTO-MIDA, České Budějovice 2001, ISBN 80-900301-9-X
- Evangelium podle Matouše / Gospel according to Matthew, KANT, Prague 2004, ISBN 80-86217-75-2
- Kaligrafie / Calligraphy, catalogue of National Gallery, Prague 2008
- Sůl země / Salt of the Earth, MONTANEX, Ostrava 2011, ISBN 978-80-7225-357-9
