= Medlov =

Medlov may refer to places in the Czech Republic:

- Medlov (Brno-Country District), a market town in the South Moravian Region
- Medlov (Olomouc District), a municipality and village in the Olomouc Region
- Medlov, a village and part of Zborovice in the Zlín Region
