= John Harris (curator) =

British curator, historian and author (1931–2022)

John Frederick Harris OBE
- John Harris at the launch of his book, Moving Rooms on 24 October 2007
- Born: 13 August 1931; Holloway, London, England
- Died: 6 May 2022 (aged 90); Badminton, Gloucestershire, U.S.
- Occupations: Architectural historian and curator

John Frederick Harris, OBE (13 August 1931 – 6 May 2022) was an English curator, historian of architecture, gardens, and architectural drawings, and the author of more than 25 books and catalogues, and 200 articles. He was a Fellow and Curator Emeritus of the Drawings Collection of the Royal Institute of British Architects, founding Trustee of Save Britain's Heritage and Save Europe's Heritage, and founding member and Honorary Life President of the International Confederation of Architectural Museums.

== Life and career ==
John Frederick Harris was born at the City of London Maternity Hospital in Holloway, London on 13 August 1931, to Maud, a housewife, and Frederick Harris, an upholsterer. He left school shortly before he was 14. He travelled and took on miscellaneous jobs before starting his proper career in 1954, working in an antiques shop, Collin and Winslow. In 1956, he joined the Royal Institute of British Architects (RIBA) Library and Drawings Collection in London, becoming curator of its British Architectural Library's Drawings Collection from 1960 to 1986. This included the establishment in 1972 of a permanent home for the Drawings Collection in the James Adam-designed house at 21 Portman Square (moved to the V&A Henry Cole Wing in 2002), next door to and sharing with the Courtauld Institute at Home House, 20 Portman Square (moved to Somerset House in 1989). Harris founded and organised 42 exhibitions at the Heinz Gallery, on the ground floor of 21 Portman Square, opened in 1972, designed by Stefan Buzas and Alan Irvine, given by Mr and Mrs Henry J Heinz II, being the first purpose-built gallery for the display of architectural drawings in the English speaking world. The Gallery was purchased in 2000 by the Irish Architectural Archive and moved in 2003–4 to the ground floor of their relocated premises at 45 Merrion Square, Dublin, which opened to the public in 2005. RIBA's Drawings Collection Gallery was re-established in 2004 as part of the joint V&A and RIBA Architecture Partnership, creating the Architecture Gallery in Room 128 at the V&A.

Harris was a co-curator of the seminal Destruction of the Country House exhibition held at the V&A in 1974, with Sir Roy Strong and Marcus Binney, which gave impetus to the movement to conserve British country houses and the founding in 1975 of Save Britain's Heritage. He was editor of Studies in Architecture 1976–99. In 1996 he was a visiting scholar at the Getty Research Center, Getty Villa, Santa Monica. Harris also played a crucial role in the establishment of the Canadian Centre for Architecture in Montreal and the Heinz Architecture Centre in the Carnegie Museum of Art, Pittsburgh. He was a member of Mr. Paul Mellon's London Acquisitions Committee for ten years. Harris worked on the Victoria and Albert Primary Galleries Project (1996–2001). He was on the Board of Trustees of The Architecture Foundation. He was a Fellow of the Society of Antiquaries of London. He was an expert on Palladian architecture, and wrote about, among many others, Lord Burlington, William Kent, and Sir William Chambers.

He was married to American historian and author Dr Eileen Harris (from circa 1961), had a son, Lucian Guthrie, and a daughter, Georgina, and lived in London and Badminton, Gloucestershire. Harris died at his home in Badminton, Gloucestershire, on 6 May 2022, aged 90.

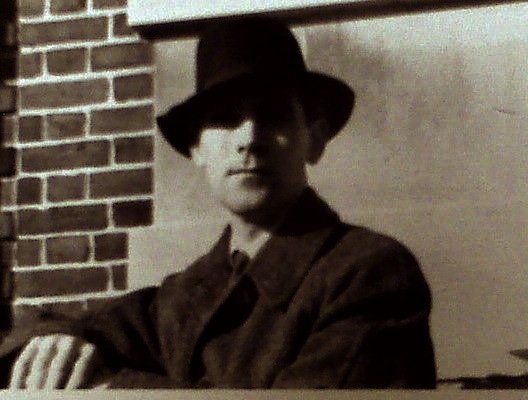
John Frederick Harris, UK

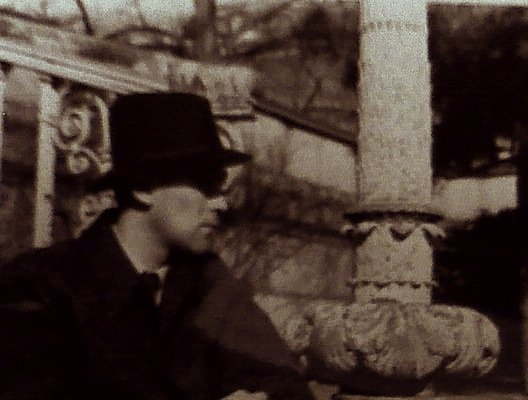
John Frederick Harris 2, UK

== Bibliography ==
=== Books ===
- Harris, John (1960). English Decorative Ironwork from Contemporary Source Books, 1610–1836 : a collection of drawings and pattern books ... Master Hands Series. London: Tiranti.
- Regency Furniture Designs from Contemporary Source Books, 1803–26 (1961) Master Hands Series, Tiranti, ISBN 0-85458-638-5, ISBN 978-0-85458-638-7. A Collection of Pattern Books with Various Comparative Plates of 1744 to 1812 (1961) Tiranti, ASIN: B0000CKZQR.
- Lincolnshire (1964) Buildings of England series, with Nikolaus Pevsner, Penguin. Revised by Nicholas Antram in 1970 and 1989.
- Georgian Country Houses (1968) Royal Institute of British Architects Drawings Series, Country Life Books, ISBN 0-600-43152-5, ISBN 978-0-600-43152-7.
- Sir William Chambers: Knight of the Polar Star (1970) with J. Mordaunt Crook and Eileen Harris, Zwemmer, ISBN 0-302-02076-4, ISBN 978-0-302-02076-0.
- Catalogue of British Drawings for Architecture, Decoration, Sculpture and Landscape Gardening In American Collections 1550–1900 (1971) Irvington Pub, ISBN 0-8398-0766-X, ISBN 978-0-8398-0766-7.
- A Country House Index (1971) An index to over 2000 country houses illustrated in 107 books of country views published between 1715 and 1872, together with a list of British country house guides and country house art collection catalogues for the period 1726–1880, Pinhorns Handbooks No 7, ISBN 0-901262-10-2, ISBN 978-0-901262-10-3. 2nd edition (1979) Pinhorns, ISBN 0-901262-21-8, ISBN 978-0-901262-21-9.
- Catalogue of the Drawings Collection of the Royal Institute of British Architects: Inigo Jones and John Webb (1973) Gregg Revivals, ISBN 0-576-15559-4, ISBN 978-0-576-15559-5.
- Catalogue of the Drawings Collection of the Royal Institute of British Architects: Colen Campbell (1973) Gregg Revivals, ISBN 0-576-15562-4, ISBN 978-0-576-15562-5.
- The Destruction of the Country House: 1875–1975 (1974) with Roy Strong and Marcus Binney, Thames & Hudson Ltd, ISBN 0-500-24094-9, ISBN 978-0-500-24094-6.
- Gardens of Delight, The Rococo English Landscape of Thomas Robins The Elder (1978) with natural history notes by Dr Martyn Rix, 2 volumes, Basilisk Press, limited edition of 515 copies, based on the 1975-6 RIBA exhibition.
- A Garden Alphabet (1979) compiled by John Harris in association with The Victoria and Albert Museum for the Garden Exhibition, Octopus Books, ISBN 0-7064-1082-3, ISBN 978-0-7064-1082-2.
- The Artist and the Country House (1979) Sotheby Parke Bernet, ISBN 0-85667-053-7, ISBN 978-0-85667-053-4.
- Lost Houses of Scotland (1980) with Marcus Binney and Emma Winnington, Save Britain's Heritage, ISBN 0-905978-05-6, ISBN 978-0-905978-05-5.
- The Palladians (1982) Rizzoli, paperback, ISBN 0-8478-0420-8, ISBN 978-0-8478-0420-7.
- William Talman: Maverick Architect (1982) Genius of Architecture Series, Allen and Unwin, ISBN 0-04-720024-3, ISBN 978-0-04-720024-3. Paperback edition (1982) ISBN 0-04-720025-1, ISBN 978-0-04-720025-0.
- Great Drawings from the Collection of the Royal Institute of British Architects (1983) with Jill Lever and Margaret Richardson, Trefoil Publications Ltd, ISBN 0-86294-036-2, ISBN 978-0-86294-036-2. Also ISBN 0-86294-037-0, ISBN 978-0-86294-037-9.
- The Architect and the British Country House, 1620–1920 (1985) American Institute of Architects Press, paperback, ISBN 0-913962-75-9, ISBN 978-0-913962-75-6.
- The Design of the English Country House 1620-1920 (1985) Trefoil Publications Ltd, hardcover, ISBN 0-86294-067-2, ISBN 978-0-86294-067-6.
- Carlo Fontana: The Drawings at Windsor Castle (1987).
- Architectural Drawings in the Collection of the Cooper-Hewitt Museum (1987) with Nancy Aakre and Lisa Taylor, Cooper-Hewitt Museum, ISBN 0-910503-20-6, ISBN 978-0-910503-20-4.
- Inigo Jones: Complete Architectural Drawings (1989) Studies in Architecture, Zwemmer, ISBN 0-302-00608-7, ISBN 978-0-302-00608-5.
- Sir William Chambers: Catalogues of Architectural Drawings in the Victoria and Albert Museum (1997) with Stephen Astley, Janine Barrier, and Gertrud Siedmann, edited by Michael Snodin, V&A Publications, ISBN 1-85177-182-4, ISBN 978-1-85177-182-0.
- No Voice from the Hall: Early Memories of a Country House Snooper (1998) John Murray, ISBN 0-7195-5567-1, ISBN 978-0-7195-5567-1. Large print edition (1998) ISIS Large Print Books, ISBN 0-7531-5452-8, ISBN 978-0-7531-5452-6. Paperback edition (2000) John Murray, ISBN 0-7195-6149-3, ISBN 978-0-7195-6149-8.
- Echoing Voices: More Memories of a Country House Snooper (2002) John Murray, ISBN 0-7195-6483-2, ISBN 978-0-7195-6483-3. Large print edition (2003) Ulverscroft, ISBN 0-7531-9908-4, ISBN 978-0-7531-9908-4. Paperback edition (2003) John Murray, ISBN 0-7195-6492-1, ISBN 978-0-7195-6492-5. Paperback large print edition (2004) Ulverscroft, ISBN 0-7531-9909-2, ISBN 978-0-7531-9909-1.
- Moving Rooms: The Trade in Architectural Salvages (2007) Yale University Press, ISBN 0-300-12420-1, ISBN 978-0-300-12420-0.
- Badminton: The Duke of Beaufort, His House (2007).

==== Editor ====
- Catalogue of the Drawings by Inigo Jones, John Webb and Isaac De Caus at Worcester College, Oxford (1979) edited with A.A. Tait, Oxford University Press, ISBN 0-19-817362-8, ISBN 978-0-19-817362-5.
- The Rise and Progress of the Present Taste in Planting: Parks, Pleasure Grounds, Gardens, etc: A Facsimile (1970) Oriel Press, ISBN 0-85362-104-7, ISBN 978-0-85362-104-1.
- Country Seat: Studies in the History of the British Country House (1970) Presented to Sir John Summerson on His Sixty-Fifth Birthday Together with a Select Bibliography of His Published Writings, edited with Howard Colvin, published by Allen Lane (the Penguin Press), ISBN 0-7139-0113-6, ISBN 978-0-7139-0113-9.

=== Exhibition catalogues ===
- A Passion for Building: the Amateur Architect in England 1650–1850 (2007) with Robert Hradsky, for Sir John Soane's Museum, ISBN 978-0-9549041-6-6.
- William Kent (1685–1748): A Poet on Paper (1998) Sir John Soane's Museum.
- Sir William Chambers: Architect to George III (1996) Yale University Press, ISBN 0-300-06940-5.
- The Artist and the Country House: From the Fifteenth Century to the Present Day (1996) Exhibition to Benefit the Prince of Wales's Institute of Architecture, Sotheby's, ISBN 0-9622588-2-2, ISBN 978-0-9622588-2-4.
- The Palladian Revival: Lord Burlington, His Villa and Garden at Chiswick (1994) Yale University Press, ISBN 0-300-05984-1, which won the Architectural Exhibition Catalogue Award of the Society of Architectural Historians in 1995.
- Silent Cities (1977) An Exhibition of the Memorial and Cemetery Architecture of the Great War, with Gavin Stamp, at the RIBA Heinz Gallery, London.
- Gardens of Delight: The Art of Thomas Robins (1975) RIBA Heinz Gallery, exhibition 9 December 1975 to 20 March 1976.
- Headfort House and Robert Adam (1973) Drawings from The Collection of Mr and Mrs Paul Mellon, at the RIBA Heinz Gallery, London.
- The King's Arcadia: Inigo Jones and the Stuart Court (1973) with Stephen Orgel and Roy Strong, a quatercentenary exhibition at the Banqueting House, Whitehall, London.

=== Essays, chapters and introductions ===
- Precedents and Various Designs Collected by C.H. Tatham (1982) in In Search of Modern Architecture: A Tribute to Henry-Russell Hitchcock, edited by Helen Searing, Architectural History Foundation/Mit Press Series, ISBN 0-262-19209-8, ISBN 978-0-262-19209-5.
- Inside Out: Historic Watercolour Drawings, Oil Sketches and Paintings of Interiors and Exteriors 1770–1870 (2000) by Frederick Michael Pick, Stair & Company, ISBN 0-9539653-0-9, ISBN 978-0-9539653-0-4. Introduction titled "Architectural Drawings: A Short Historiography".
- Vitruvius Britannicus, or The British architect... (1967–72), 4 volumes, reproduced works by Colen Campbell, J. Badeslade, John Rocque, James Gandon, John Woolfe, George Richardson, Denise Addis and Paul Breman, published by Benjamin Blom, New York.
- A Dying Breed of Connoisseur, The Art Newspaper, April 2002.
- Diverting Labyrinths, Country Life magazine, 11 January 1990.
- Strong, Roy; John Harris; Marcus Binney (10 September 2014). "Fighting the good fight". Country Life. 208 (37): 118–124.

=== Lectures ===
- The Annual Soane Lecture (2007) Sir John Soane's Museum, London, on Moving Rooms: The Trade in Architectural Salvages.
- The Andrew W Mellon Lectures (1981) on Palladian architecture in England.
