= Eileen Harris =

American-British architectural historian and author (1932–2025)

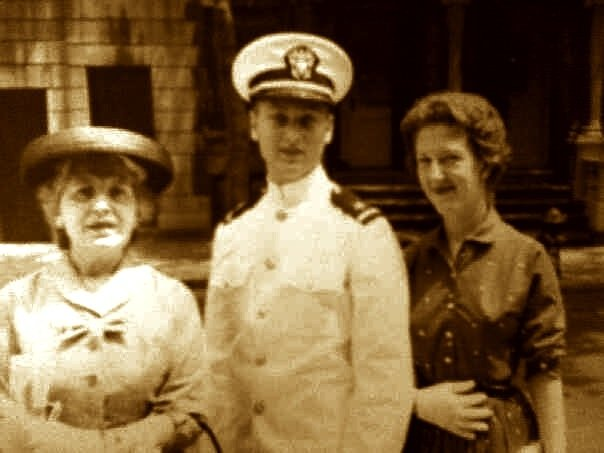
- Harris at a Naval ceremony of her brother's, Michael Ivan Spiegel
- Born: 26 November 1932; New York City, U.S.
- Died: 18 October 2025 (aged 92)
- Occupations: Architectural historian, curator

Eileen Joyce Harris (née Spiegel; 26 November 1932 – 18 October 2025) was an American-British architectural historian and author. She was an expert on Robert Adam and was Honorary Librarian and Consultant to the Adam Project at Sir John Soane's Museum in London.

== Early and family life ==
Eileen Joyce Spiegel was born in Brooklyn, New York, on 26 November 1932, to Paul Spiegel (1904–1991) and Irene Stein (1900–1991). Eileen also had a younger brother, Michael Ivan Spiegel (1934–2012), who was a famous antitrust lawyer and also Deputy Attorney General of California for 25 years.

== Career ==
Harris was an internationally recognised Robert Adam scholar, having published extensively on the subject for over 40 years. Harris, along with Nicholas Savage (of the Royal Academy Library), were the authors of on an integrated catalogue of Sir John Soane's art, architectural and general volumes and pamphlets in his library at Sir John Soane's Museum, to be made available online.

== Personal life and death ==
Harris married Englishman John Harris. Together they had a son, Lucian Guthrie, and a daughter, Georgina. Harris and her husband lived in London and Badminton, Gloucestershire. She died on 18 October 2025, at the age of 92.

== Books (in reverse chronology) ==
- The Country Houses of Robert Adam (2007) From the Archives of Country Life, Aurum Press Ltd, ISBN 1-84513-263-7, ISBN 978-1-84513-263-7.
- The Genius of Robert Adam: His Interiors (2001) Paul Mellon Centre for Studies, Yale University Press, ISBN 0-300-08129-4, ISBN 978-0-300-08129-9. Selected by Choice as a 2003 Outstanding Academic Title. Selected by Architects Journal as one of the Books of the Year (2001).
- Osterley Park, Middlesex (1994) National Trust Guide Books, ISBN 0-7078-0179-6, ISBN 978-0-7078-0179-7.
- Architectural Books in Britain, 1556-1785: An Historical and Bibliographical Account (1990) Rizzoli Intl Pubns, ISBN 0-302-00606-0, ISBN 978-0-302-00606-1.
- Arbours & Grottos. A Facsimile of the Two Parts of Universal Architecture, 1755 and 1758 (1979) Scolar Press, ISBN 0-85967-515-7, ISBN 978-0-85967-515-4.
- Sir William Chambers: Knight of the Polar Star (1970) with J. Mordaunt Crook and John Harris, Zwemmer, ISBN 0-302-02076-4, ISBN 978-0-302-02076-0.
- Furniture of Robert Adam (1963) Chapters in Art Series, Tiranti, ISBN 0-85458-929-5, ISBN 978-0-85458-929-6.

== Books - Exhibition Catalogues ==
- Hooked on Books: The Library of Sir John Soane, Architect 1753-1837 (2004) edited with Nicholas Savage, Sir John Soane's Museum.

== Articles ==
- Robert Adam on Park Avenue: The Interiors for Bolton House (1995) The Burlington Magazine, Vol 137, No 1103, February 1995, pp 68–75.
- The Lansdowne House drawing room: reconstructing Adam - properly (1992) Apollo, No 366, 1992, pp 83–86.
- Sir John Soane's Library: "O, Books! Ye Monuments of Mind" (1990) Apollo, No 338, April 1990, part of pp 224–251.
- John Wood's system of architecture (1989) The Burlington Magazine, No 1031, 1989, p 101.
- "Vitruvius Britannicus" before Colin Campbell (1986) The Burlington Magazine, Vol 128, No 998, May 1986, pp 340–346.
- Burke and Chambers on the Sublime and Beautiful (1967) Essays in the History of Architecture Presented to Rudolf Wittkower on his 65th birthday, edited by Douglas Fraser, Howard Hibbard and Milton J Lewine, Phaidon, London, pp 207–13.
