= Josef Stejskal (artist) =

Czech-Australian artist (b. 1945)

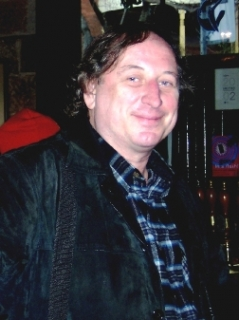
Stejskal in 2010

Josef Stejskal (also known as Josef Lada Stejskal and Josef "Pepča" Stejskal; born 3 March 1945, Kroměříž) is a Czech-Australian artist best-known for his theatre posters.

He worked as a stage designer in Husa na provázku Theatre in Brno. Since 1978, he has lived in Australia. He worked at the State Library of New South Wales.

A collection of his posters were exhibited at the Seymour Centre in 1986, a part of which were acquired by the State Library of New South Wales; others joined the Library's collection later from the Dennis Wolanski Library. Another group was acquired by the National Library of Australia in 1989, and Stejskal made donations to the National Gallery of Australia. Image galleries of Josef Stejskal's best-known artworks can be found at the NGA and at the Moravian Gallery in Brno; others are held in the Václav Havel Library in Prague.

He appears as "Pepča Psejčkař" in the autobiographical novel Hvězdy kvelbu (Stars of Suffering) by Pavel Řezníček, about the Brno Bohemian circle in the 1960s and 70s.
