= Karel Prager =

Czech architect

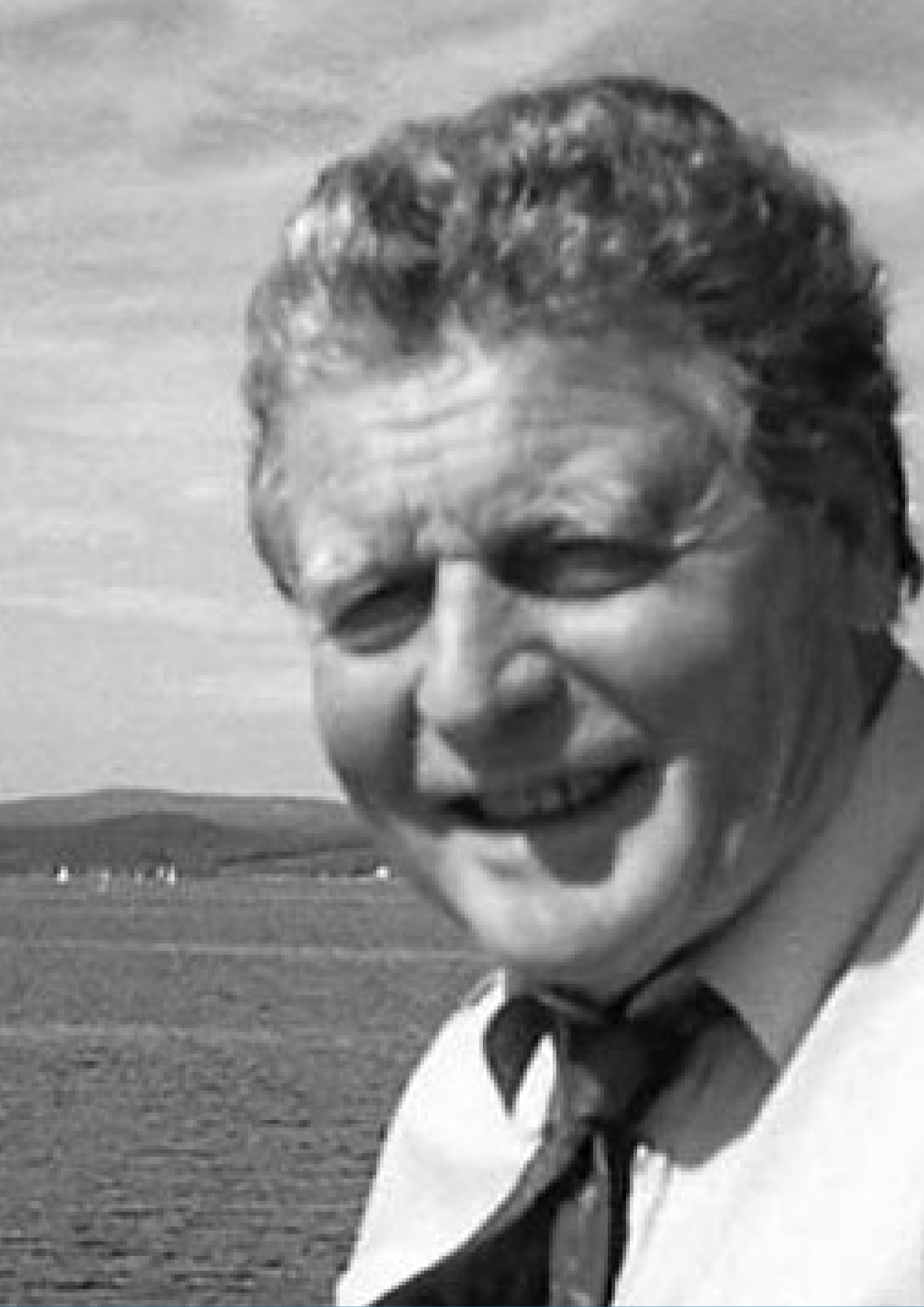
- Karel Prager
- Born: Karel Prager; September 24, 1923; Kroměříž, Czechoslovakia
- Died: May 31, 2001 (aged 77); Prague, Czech Republic
- Occupation: Architect

Karel Prager (August 24, 1923 in Kroměříž – May 31 2001 in Prague) was a Czech architect. He was one of the most prominent architects of modernist and brutalist architecture in Czechoslovakia during the second half of the 20th Century. His works include the Federal Assembly building at the top of Wenceslas Square, the landmark extension to the National Theatre ('Nova Scena', i.e. 'New Stage') and some Komerční banka buildings in Prague. His showcase structures are remarkable for their bold exteriors and striking internal spaces which blend natural light with a sophisticated use of natural materials such as wood and marble.

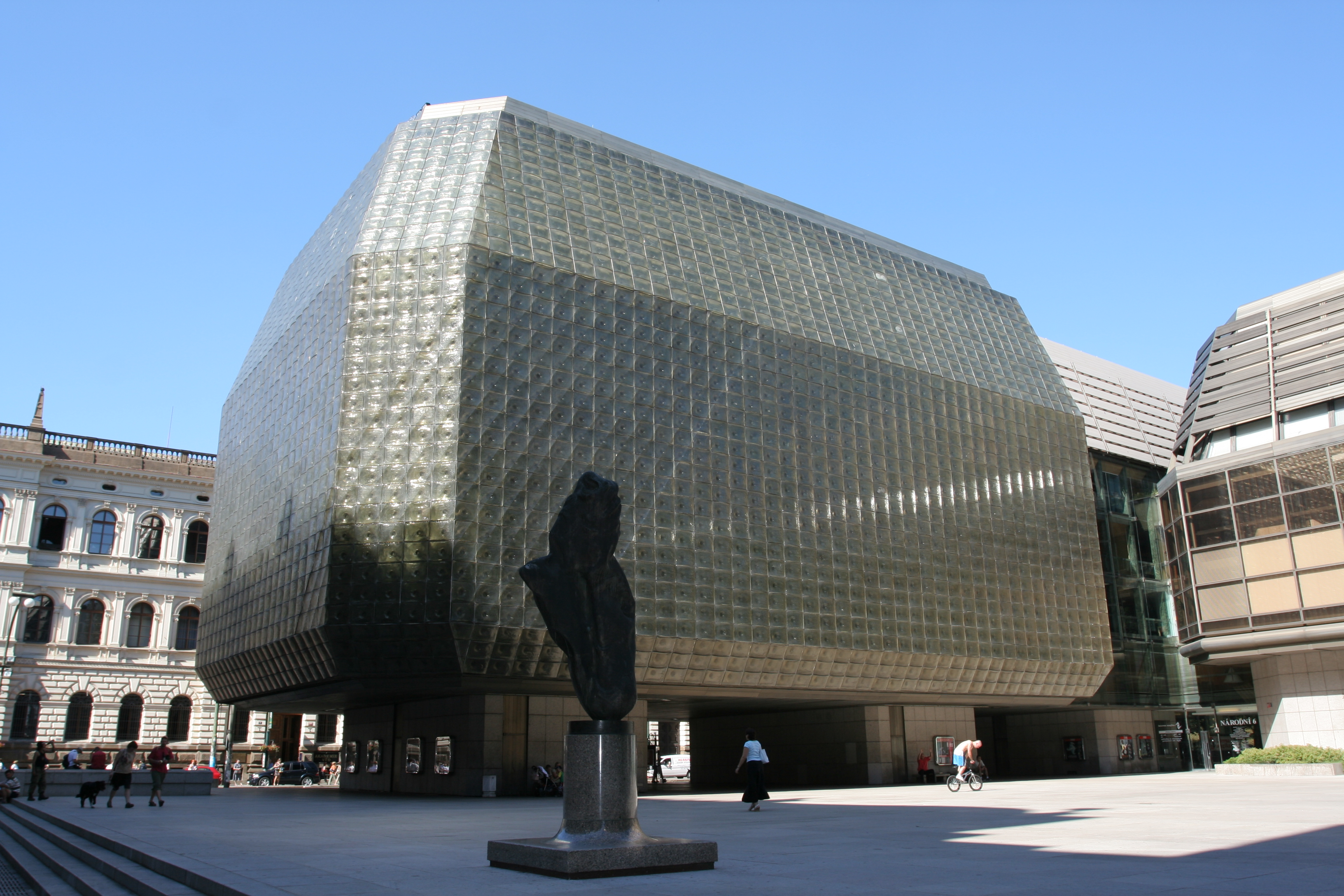
New Stage of the National Theatre, Prague

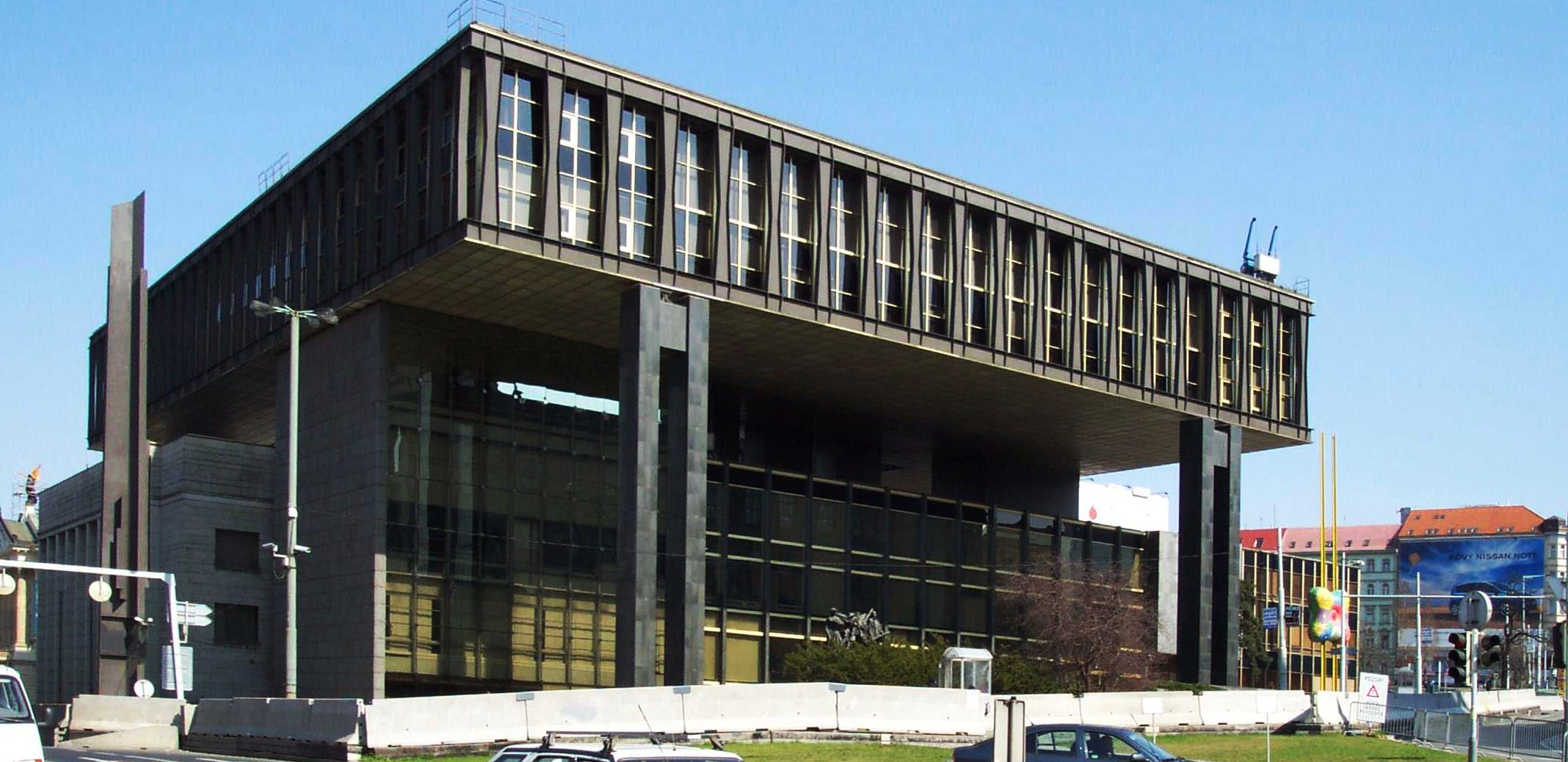
Federal Assembly, Prague

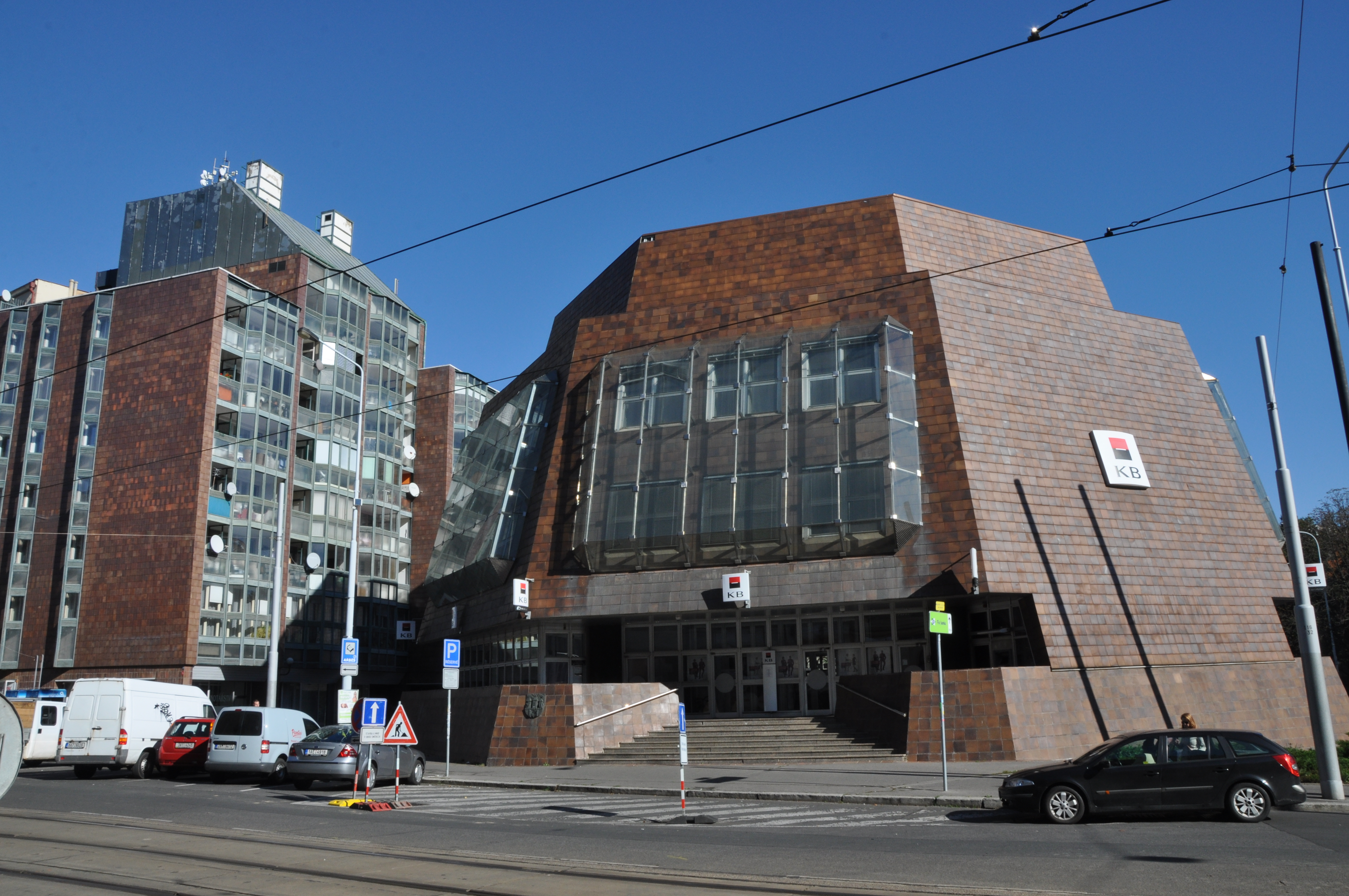
Komerční banka building, Prague

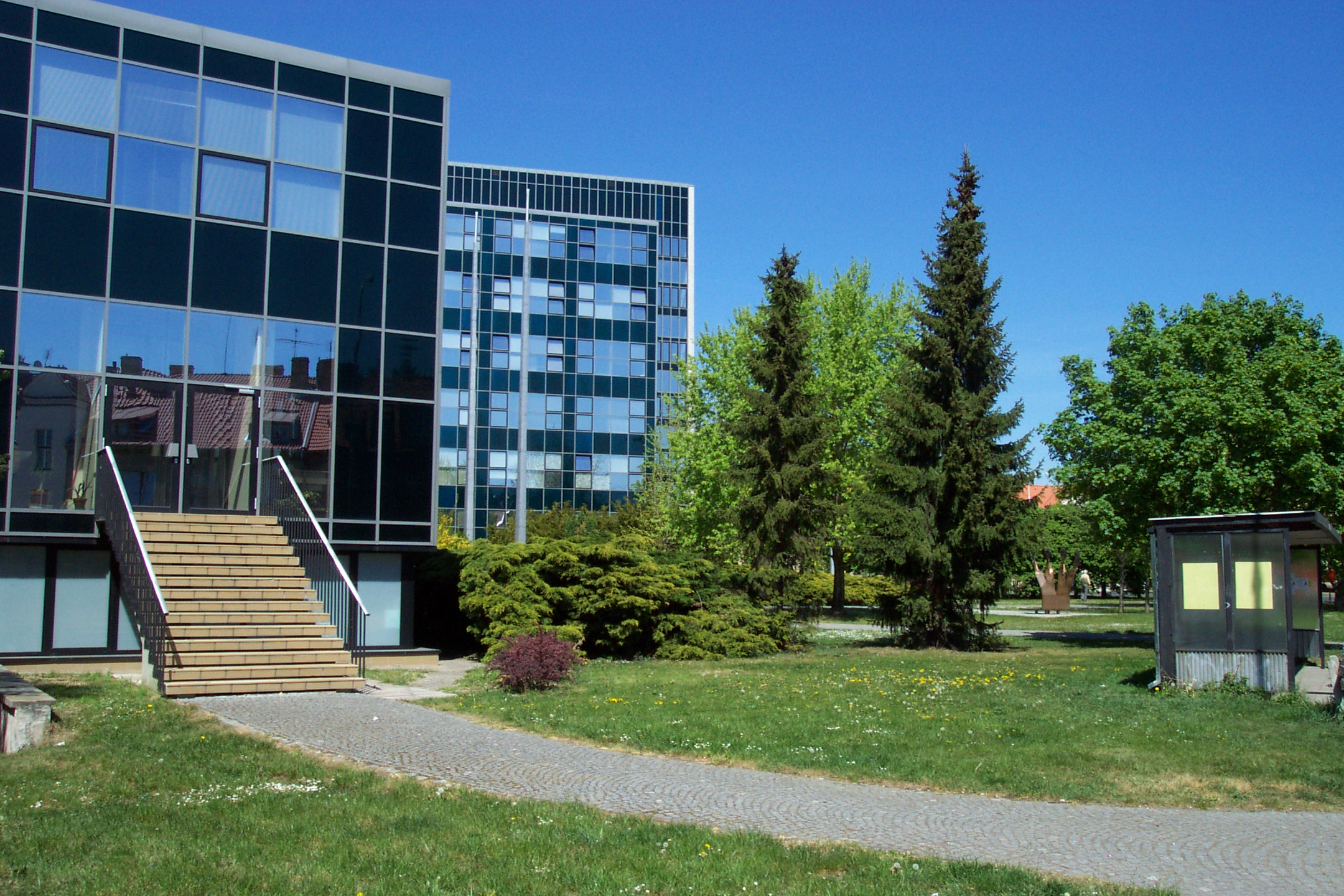
Institute of Macromolecular Chemistry building at Petřiny, Prague

== See also ==
- Karel Teige
