= Michal Peprník =

Czech writer

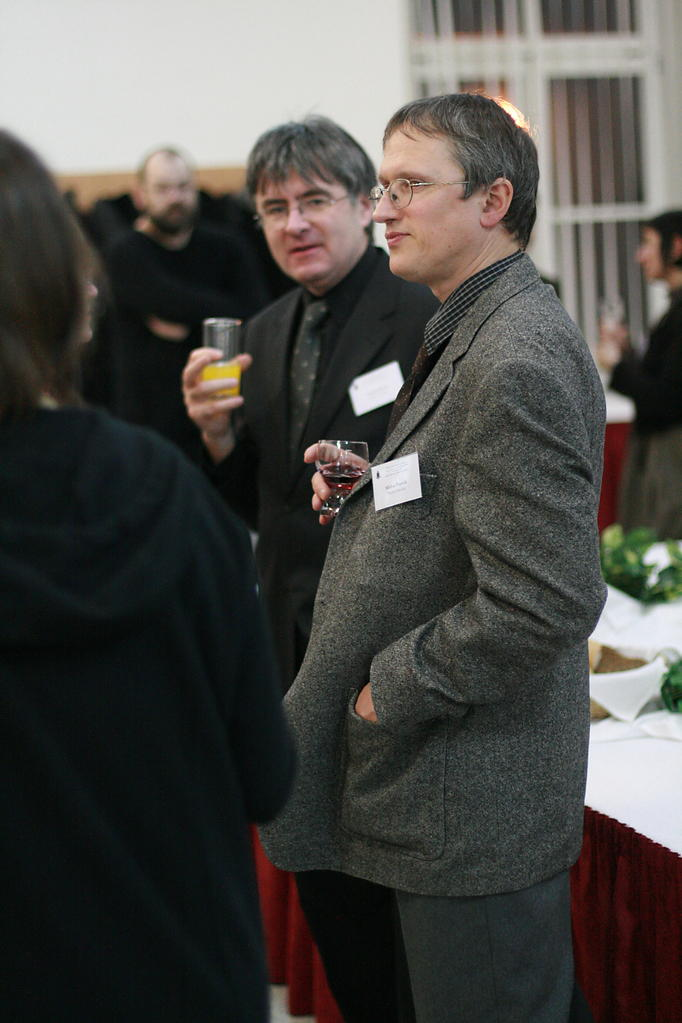
- February 2010
- Born: 9 January 1960 (age 66); Kroměříž, Czech Republic
- Occupations: University Professor, Literary Critic, Writer

Michal Peprník is a professor at Palacký University, Olomouc, Czech Republic. He is the Head of the Literature Section, and the Secretary of The Czech and Slovak Association for American Studies. He is also the chief coordinator of the international Olomouc Colloquium of American Studies.
He taught Czech literature courses at the Department of Slavonic Languages & Literatures at the University of Glasgow in 1992-1993 and habilitated in 2003. His main fields of research include American Romanticism, concepts of space (topos) and metamorphosis (transformation), the myths of the West, and the literature of the Fantastic.

== Monographs, Books ==
- Dětský hrdina v díle J. D. Salingera (1984)
- Motiv metamorfózy v díle Jamese Hogga, R. L. Stevensona a George MacDonalda (1995)
- Směry literární interpretace XX.století/texty, komentáře (2000, 2005)
- Metamorfóza jako kulturní metafora [Metamorphosis as a Cultural Metaphor] (2004)
- Topos lesa v americké literatuře (2005)

== Essays and other academic papers ==
- Literature as a Political Tool? (2003)
- The Place of the Other: the Dark Forest (2003)
- Fenomén Bercovitch aneb jak dobý(í)t Ameriku (2003)
- Democratic Ideals in American Popular Culture and Literature (2004)
- Podstatný hybrid (2004)
- Z Krvavé komnaty k Černé Venuši (review, 2004)
- Moravian Origins of J.F. Cooper's Indians (2004)
- Cooper's Indians: Typology and Function (2005)
- Cesta amerického románu k romantickým asociacím a mýtu (2007)
- Henry James jako literární kritik (2008)

== External links and sources ==
- Department of English and American Studies
- American Studies Colloquium
- Czech and Slovak Association for American Studies
- Lecturer Profile
- Peprník, Michal. Topos lesa v americké literatuře. Brno: Host. 2005 ISBN 80-7294-153-4
