= Václav Jan Frierenberger =

Czech general

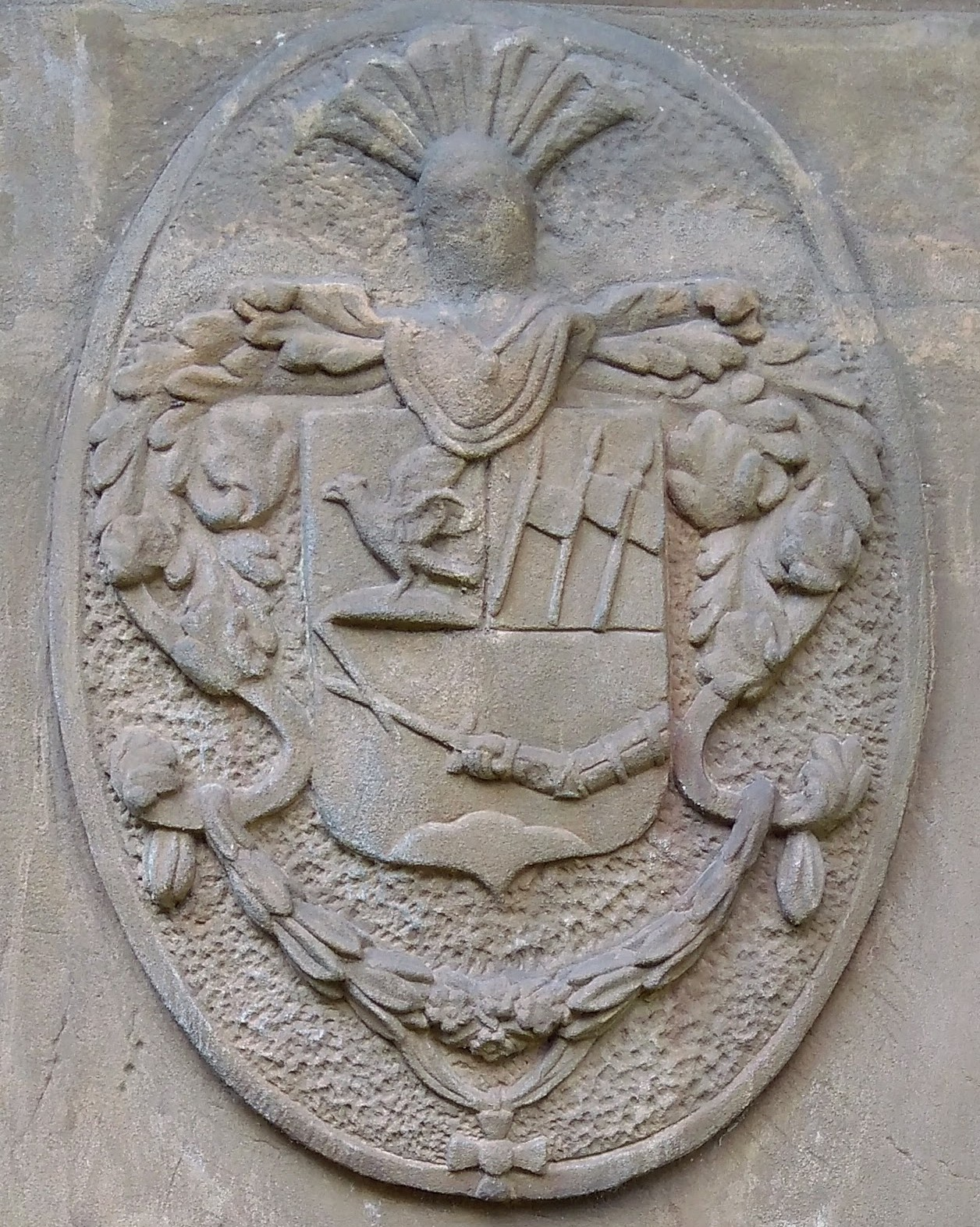
Coat of Arms Frierenberger

Jan Václav Josef Frierenberger (German: Johann Wenzel Joseph Ritter von Frierenberger; 2 September 1759 – 11 February 1823) was a Czech military leader. He was a general of the Imperial Austrian Army during the Napoleonic Wars.

== Military career ==
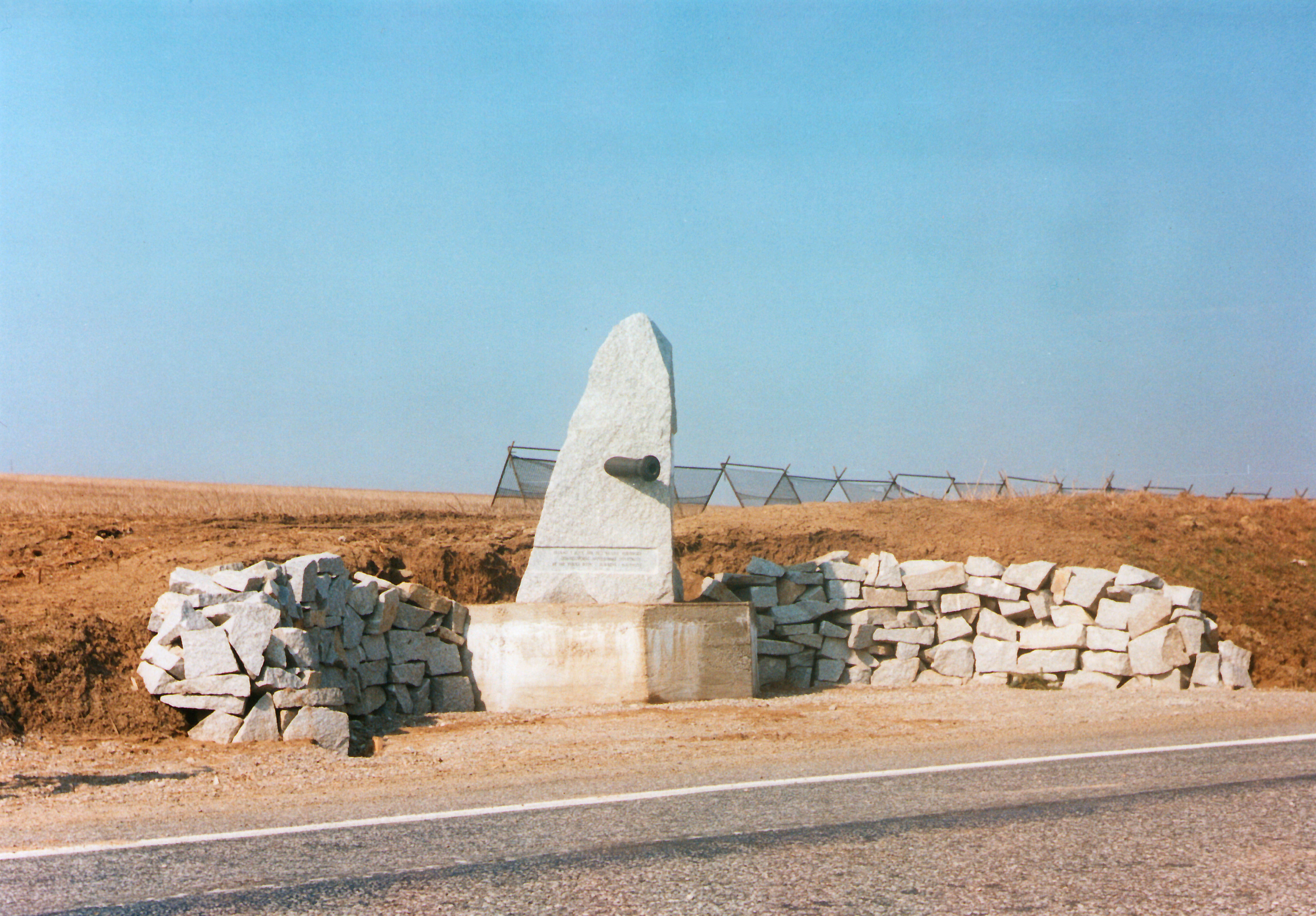
Monument to Major Frierenberger near Rousínov

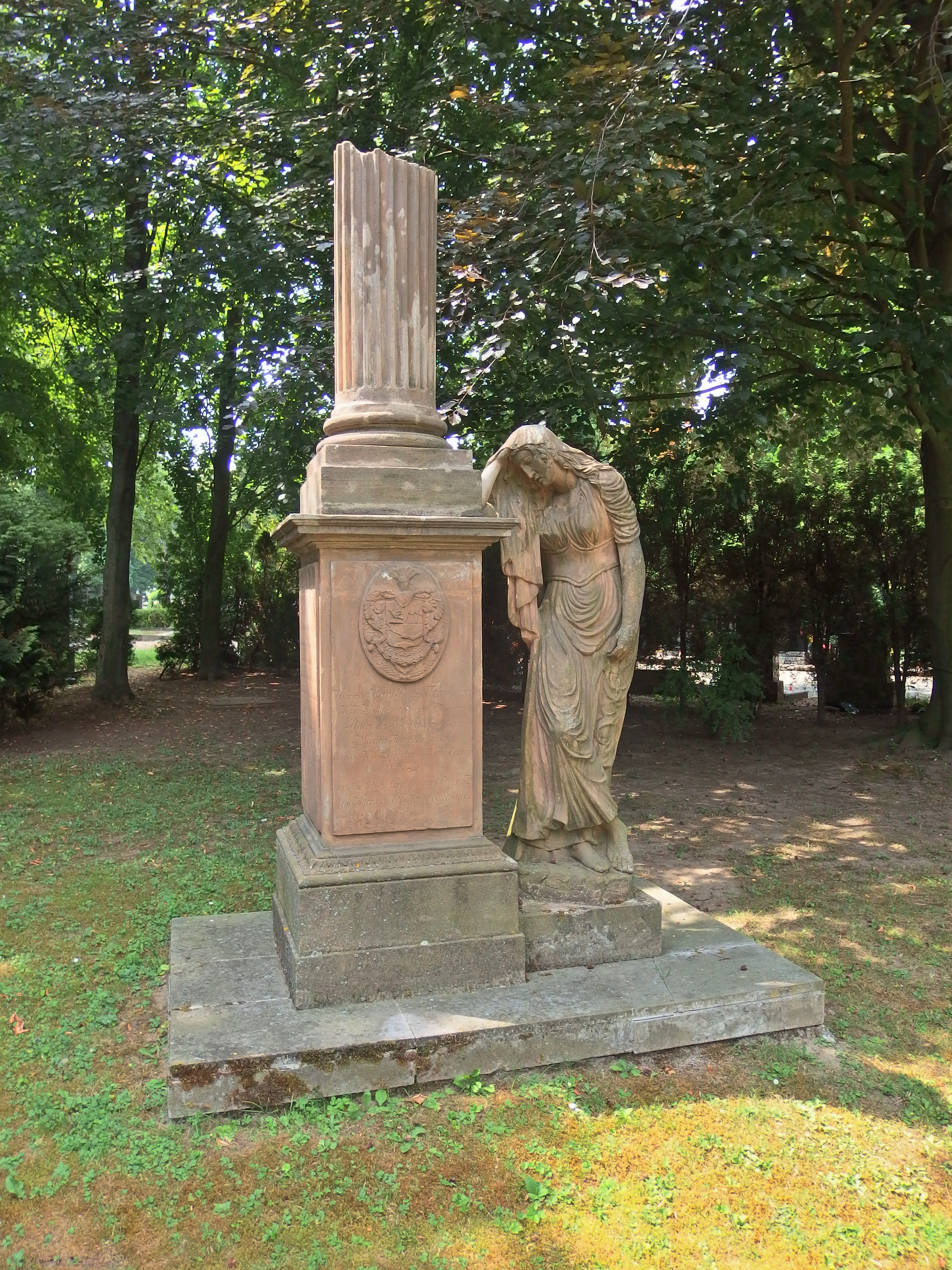
Frierenberger's grave statue

Frierenberger was born on 2 September 1759 in Český Krumlov. As an officer's son, he decided in his youth to serve in the army. He took part in the Austro-Turkish wars and in 1790 is already listed as a captain. His father Major Josef Frierenberger (1709–1773) was awarded the Military Order of Maria Theresa. After the Battle of Austerlitz he was, like his father, decorated on 28 May 1806 with the highest Austrian military decoration – Knight's Cross of the Military Order of Maria Theresa (this represented a claim to a lifetime peerage Knight (Ritter) and eventually the holder could claim the hereditary title of free lord). He was promoted to lieutenant colonel the following year and in 1809 to colonel. Subsequently, on 27 April 1813, he was promoted to major general. He was severely wounded on 26 August 1813, during the Battle of Dresden. Afterwards, the command of the artillery was taken over by General Friedrich Karl von Langenau. Subsequently, the Russian Tsar Alexander I awarded him the Russian Order of St. Anna. In January 1820, he was retired and spent the last years of his life in Kroměříž (now in the Czech Republic). He died in Kroměříž on 11 February 1823. He is buried in the old Kroměříž cemetery.

== Monument near Austerlitz ==
On 2 December 1995, a stone monument near the old post office along the Olomouc road was unveiled. It was built by the Czechoslovak Napoleonic Society together with the Austerlitz Battery to commemorate two Austrian artillery batteries, which under the command of Major Václav Jan Frierenberger covered the retreat of the Russian corps of General Pyotr Bagration at the conclusion of the Battle of Austerlitz.

== Cemetery monument ==
In 1836, Frierenberger's widow had a monument built on her husband's grave. In 1936, the memorial was relocated to the current town cemetery entrance. The memorial in the Empire style is protected as a cultural monument. The statue represents a grieving woman leaning on a pedestal which is carrying a broken Doric column. There are German inscriptions on all four sides of the pedestal shaft honoring the general.
