= Kroměříž =

- Town
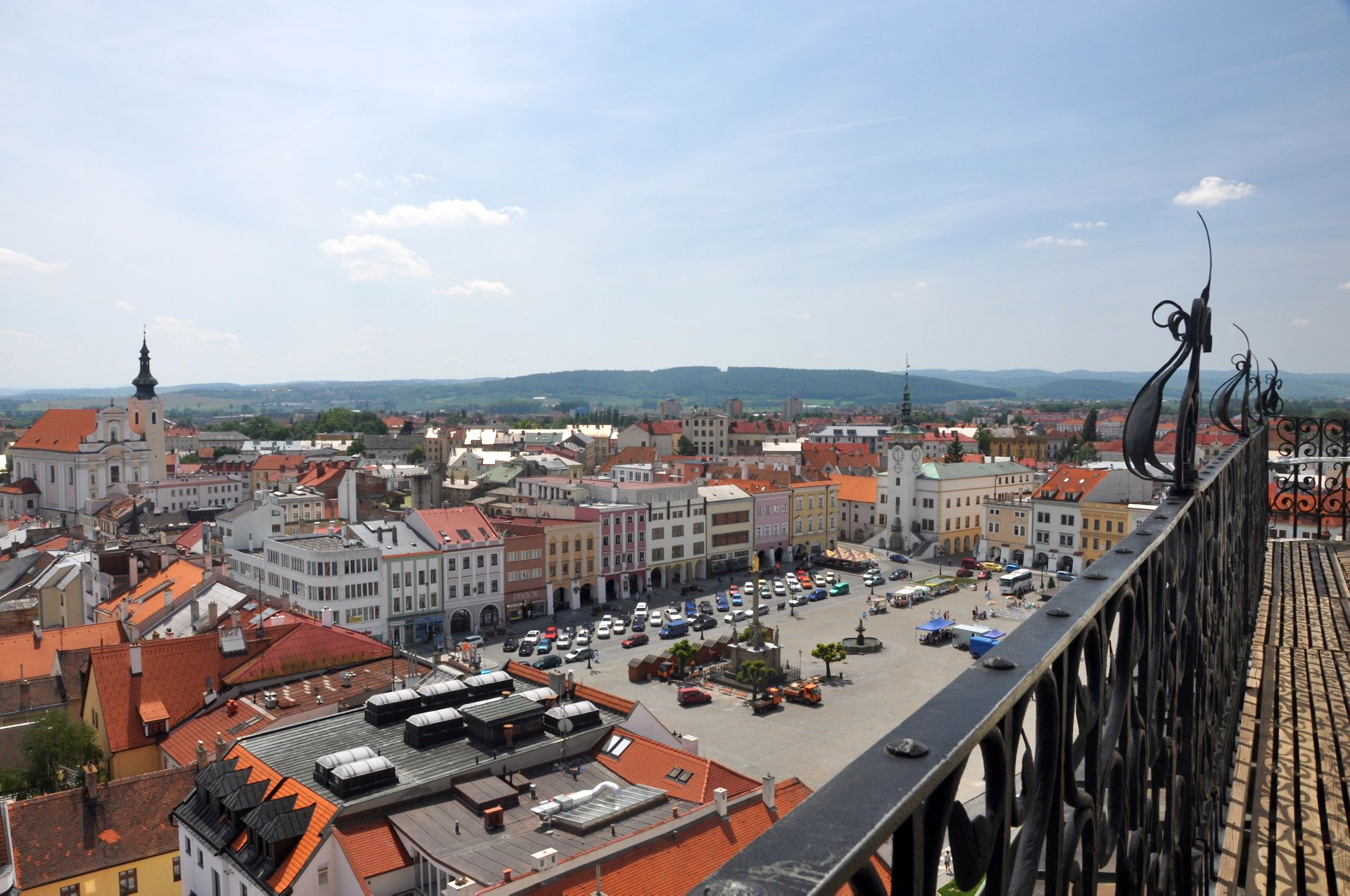
- Town square seen from the castle tower

- Flag Coat of arms

- Location in the Czech Republic
- Coordinates: 49°17′56″N 17°23′35″E
- Country: Czech Republic
- Region: Zlín
- District: Kroměříž
- First mentioned: 1107

Government
  - Mayor: Tomáš Opatrný (ANO 2011)

Area
  - Total: 50.98 km^{2} (19.68 sq mi)
- Elevation: 201 m (659 ft)

Population (2026-01-01)
  - Total: 27,781
  - Density: 544.9/km^{2} (1,411/sq mi)
- Time zone: UTC+1 (CET)
  - Summer (DST): UTC+2 (CEST)
- Postal code: 767 01
- Website: www.mesto-kromeriz.cz

UNESCO World Heritage Site
- Official name: Gardens and castle at Kroměříž
- Criteria: ii, iv
- Reference: 860
- Inscription: 1998 (22nd Session)

Kroměříž (Czech pronunciation: [ˈkromɲɛr̝iːʃ]; German: Kremsier) is a town in the Zlín Region of the Czech Republic. It has about 28,000 inhabitants. The town is situated on both banks of the Morava River.

Kroměříž was founded in the first half of the 12th century at the latest, and became a town in 1290. It was owned by the bishops and archbishops of Olomouc, who significantly contributed to the development of the settlement. Kroměříž is known for Kroměříž Castle and its castle gardens, which is a UNESCO World Heritage Site. The historic town centre with the castle complex is well preserved and is protected as an urban monument reservation.

== Administrative division ==
Kroměříž consists of ten municipal parts (in brackets population according to the 2021 census):

- Kroměříž (24,415)
- Bílany (323)
- Drahlov (155)
- Hradisko (226)
- Kotojedy (221)
- Postoupky (598)
- Těšnovice (419)
- Trávník (601)
- Vážany (1,174)
- Zlámanka (148)

== Etymology ==
The name is derived from the personal name Kroměžir, meaning "Kroměžir's (property)".

== Geography ==
Kroměříž is located about 20 kilometres (12 mi) northwest of Zlín. About two thirds of the municipal territory lies in the Litenčice Hills. The eastern part lies in the Upper Morava Valley and a small southern part extends into the Chřiby range. The highest point of the town's territory is the Obora hill at 322 m (1,056 ft) above sea level. The town is situated on both banks of the Morava River. The Haná River flows into the Morava on the northern outskirts of the town.

== History ==
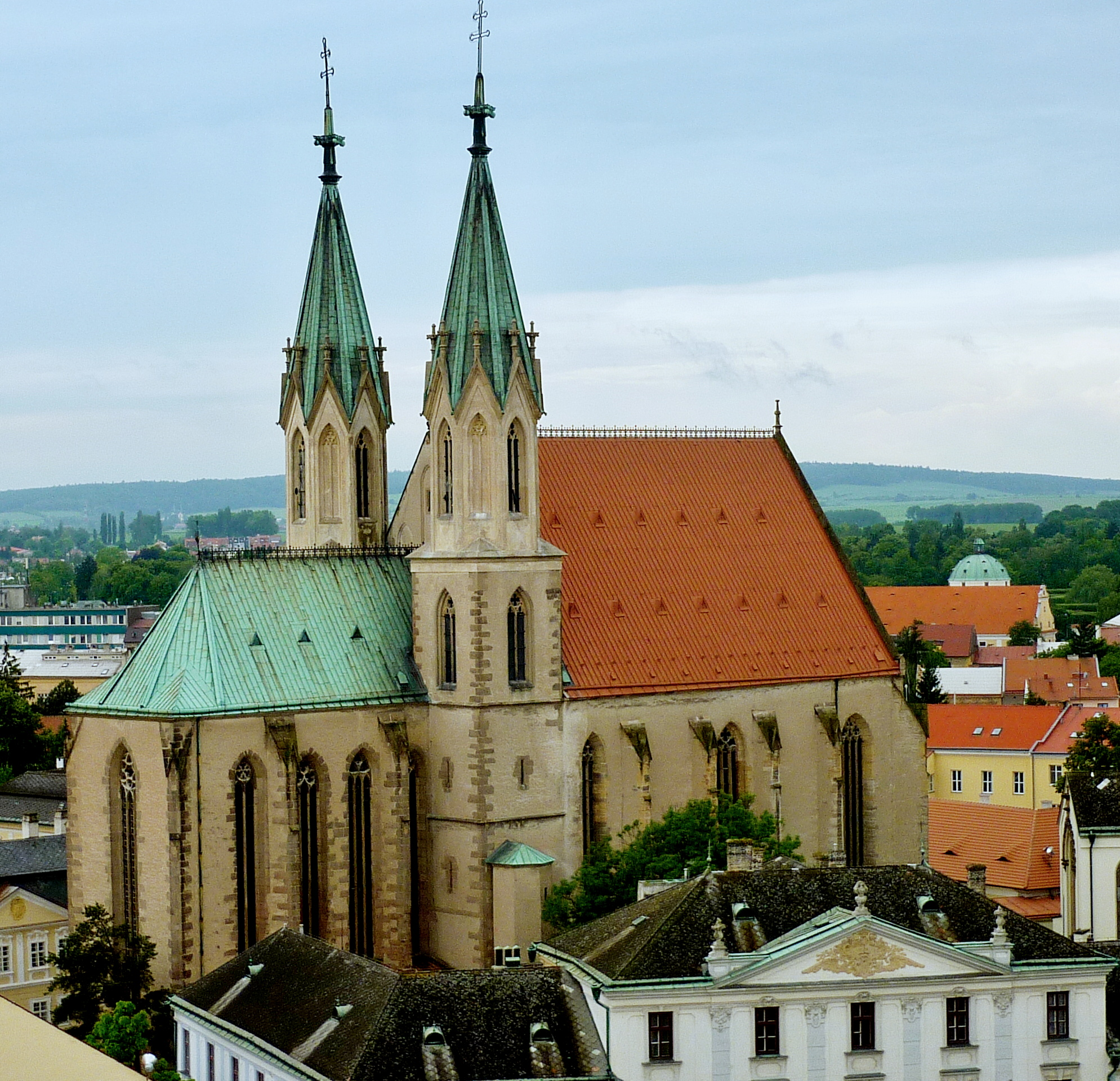
Church of Saint Maurice

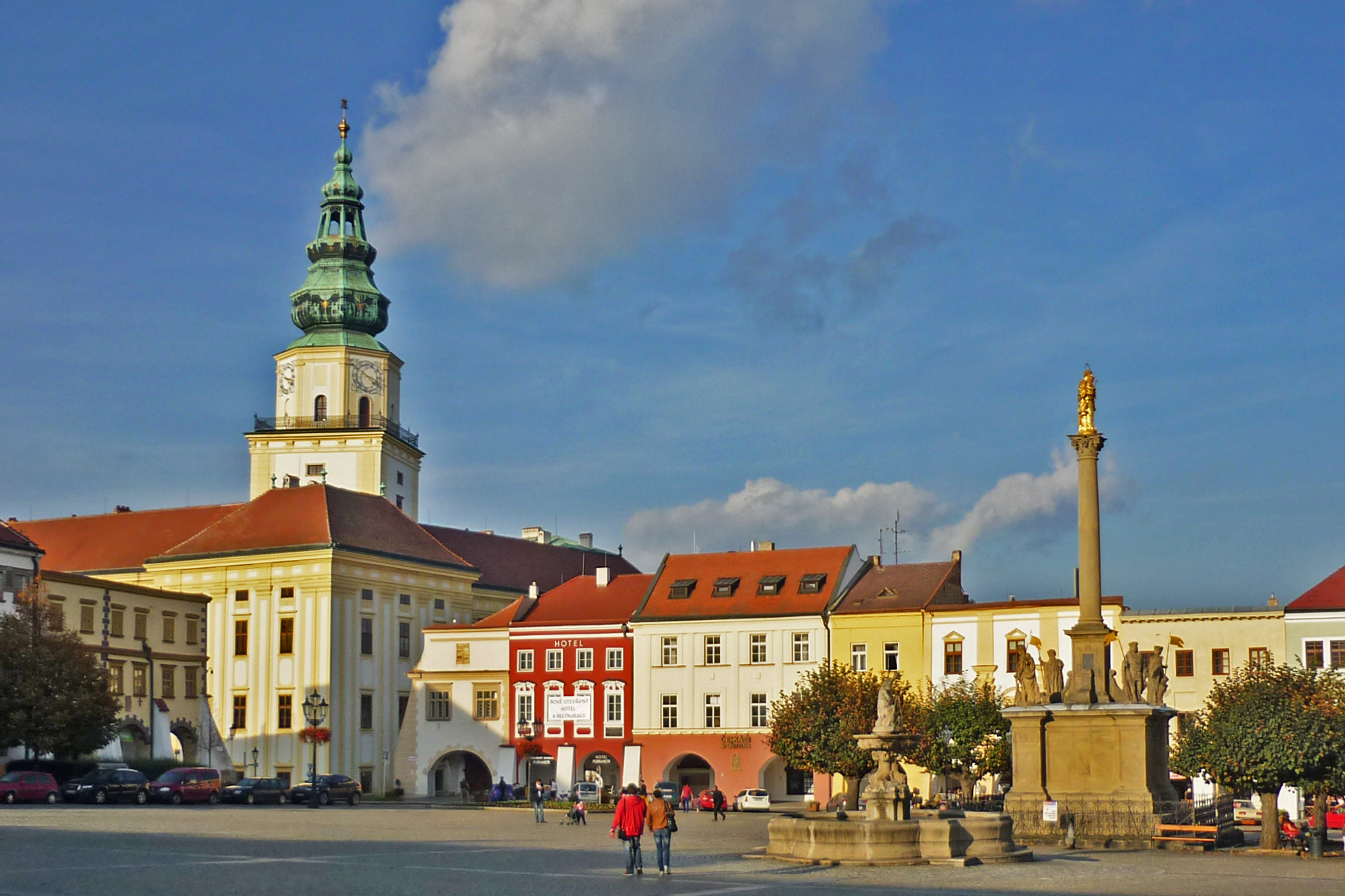
The square Velké náměstí with Kroměříž Castle

The first written mention of Kroměříž (under its Latin name Cromezir) is in a document written between 1107 and 1125, when the settlement was bought by Olomouc bishop Jan II. Some sources cite a deed of another Olomouc bishop Jindřich Zdík from 1141 as the first unquestionable written mention of Kroměříž. In the Middle Ages, it was a market village on the crossroads of the Amber and Salt roads. It was located at a ford across the Morava River where the toll was collected.

In the 13th century, Kroměříž became the centre of a dominion owned by the Olomouc bishopric. The Knights Hospitaller settled here and built a church and a commandery in 1238. In 1241 and 1253, Kroměříž suffered raids by the Tatars, Cumans and Hungarians. The settlement got depopulated and had to be recolonised. Kroměříž is last referred to as a market village in a document by King Ottokar II from 1256. After 1256, the Olomouc bishop Bruno von Schauenburg came to power over Kroměříž. He improved the village and fundamentally contributed to its development. He founded the market square on the hill above the original settlement and had it surrounded with walls. He also had the Church of Saint Maurice built and had vineyards planted around the settlement. In 1266, Kroměříž was first referred to as a town. In 1290, Kroměříž was officially promoted to a town.

In 1322, Jews were allowed to settle in the town. In the mid-16th century, the Kroměříž Jewish community was the largest Jewish community in Moravia. The bishops protected the community for the income flowing from it. In 1423, during the Hussite Wars, the bishops lost control over the town. They regained the town in 1455.

During the rule of bishop Stanislav I Thurzo, the local bishop's residence was repaired and rebuilt into a late Gothic and Renaissance castle. His followers further refined the town and provided costly building repairs.

The town and the castle were badly damaged in the Thirty Years' War. It was plundered by Swedish troops under command of Lennart Torstensson in 1643. Most of the buildings were burned down. The town was further damaged by a large fire in 1656. Kroměříž recovered during the rule of Bishop Karl II von Liechtenstein-Kastelkorn, who had rebuilt the town and the castle. The castle was first repaired, and in 1686 completely rebuilt. The bishop also has repaired town walls, and founded a mint and representative gardens in 1666–1675. Kroměříž again became an important town.

The Constitutive Imperial Congress sat in Kroměříž in 1848. In August 1885, a meeting took place here between the Austrian and the Russian emperors.

== Demographics ==
Historical population

Year	Pop.	±%
1869	12,848	—
1880	15,038	+17.0%
1890	15,897	+5.7%
1900	17,509	+10.1%
1910	20,186	+15.3%

Year	Pop.	±%
1921	20,767	+2.9%
1930	22,024	+6.1%
1950	22,782	+3.4%
1961	23,178	+1.7%
1970	24,478	+5.6%

Year	Pop.	±%
1980	27,835	+13.7%
1991	28,636	+2.9%
2001	29,225	+2.1%
2011	29,154	−0.2%
2021	28,280	−3.0%

Source: Censuses

== Economy ==
On the outskirts of the town is the Agricultural Research Institute Kroměříž (formerly the Research Institute of Grain, etc., founded in 1951), which is engaged in research and breeding of cereals.

There is a hospital and a psychiatric hospital in Kroměříž. Both are among the town's largest employers.

== Transport ==
The D1 motorway from Brno to Ostrava runs through the northern part of the town.

Kroměříž is located on the railway lines Rožnov pod Radhoštěm–Kojetín and Bystřice pod Hostýnem–Zborovice. In addition to the main train station, the town is also served by the stops Kroměříž-Oskol and Kotojedy.

== Culture ==
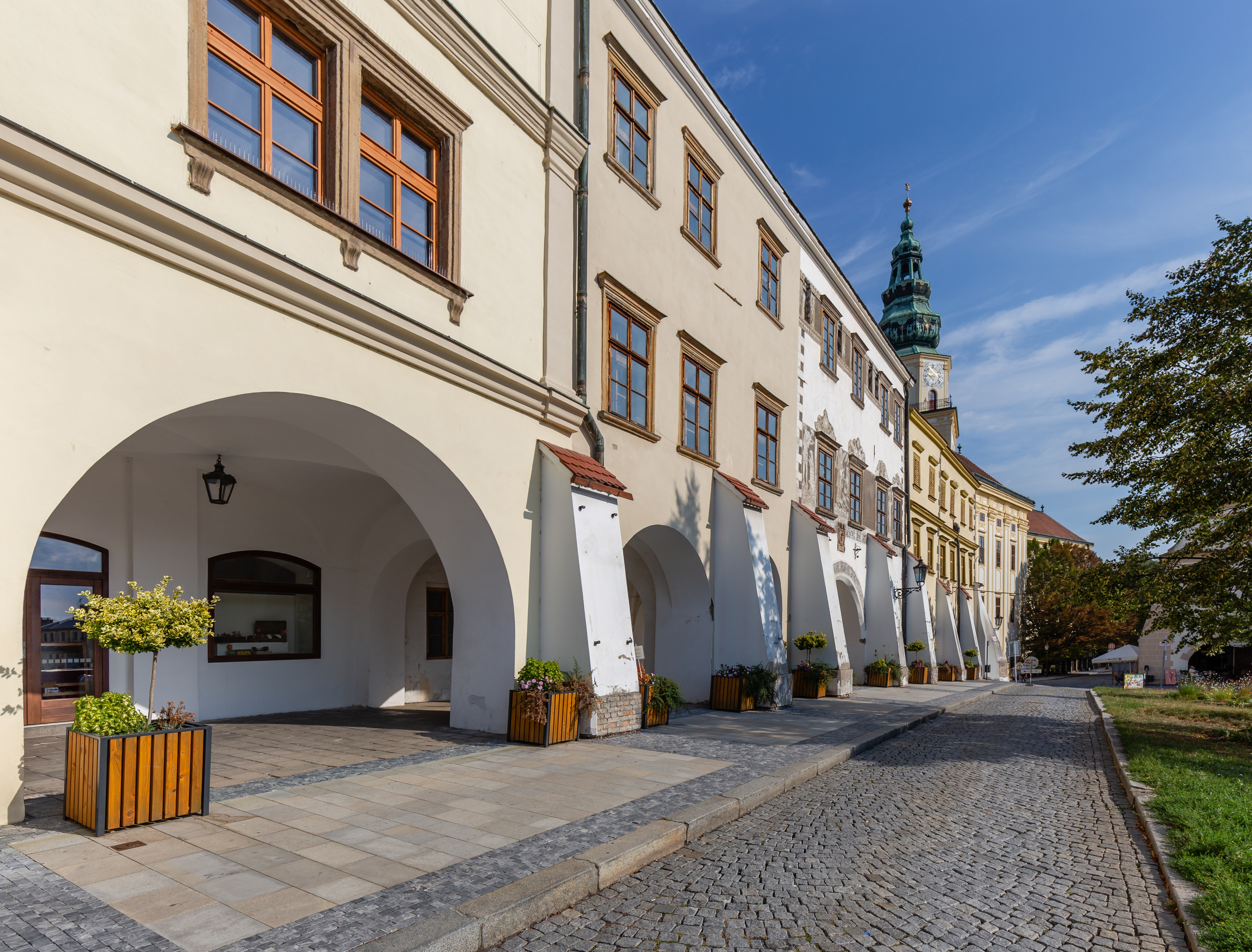
Regents's house and Kroměříž Region Museum

Kroměříž lies in the ethnographic region of Haná. It has rich cultural life for which it earned a nickname "Athens of Haná". The town has traditionally held an international festival of military brass music and the international festival of sacred music Forfest.

The Castle Gallery has collection of about 500 paintings and is among the most significant in Europe. It includes Flaying of Marsyas, a late painting by Titian.

== Sport ==
The town is home of the football club SK Hanácká Slavia Kroměříž. The club played mainly in the third tier of the Czech football system, but from the 2025–26 season, it plays in the Czech National Football League (second tier).

== Sights ==
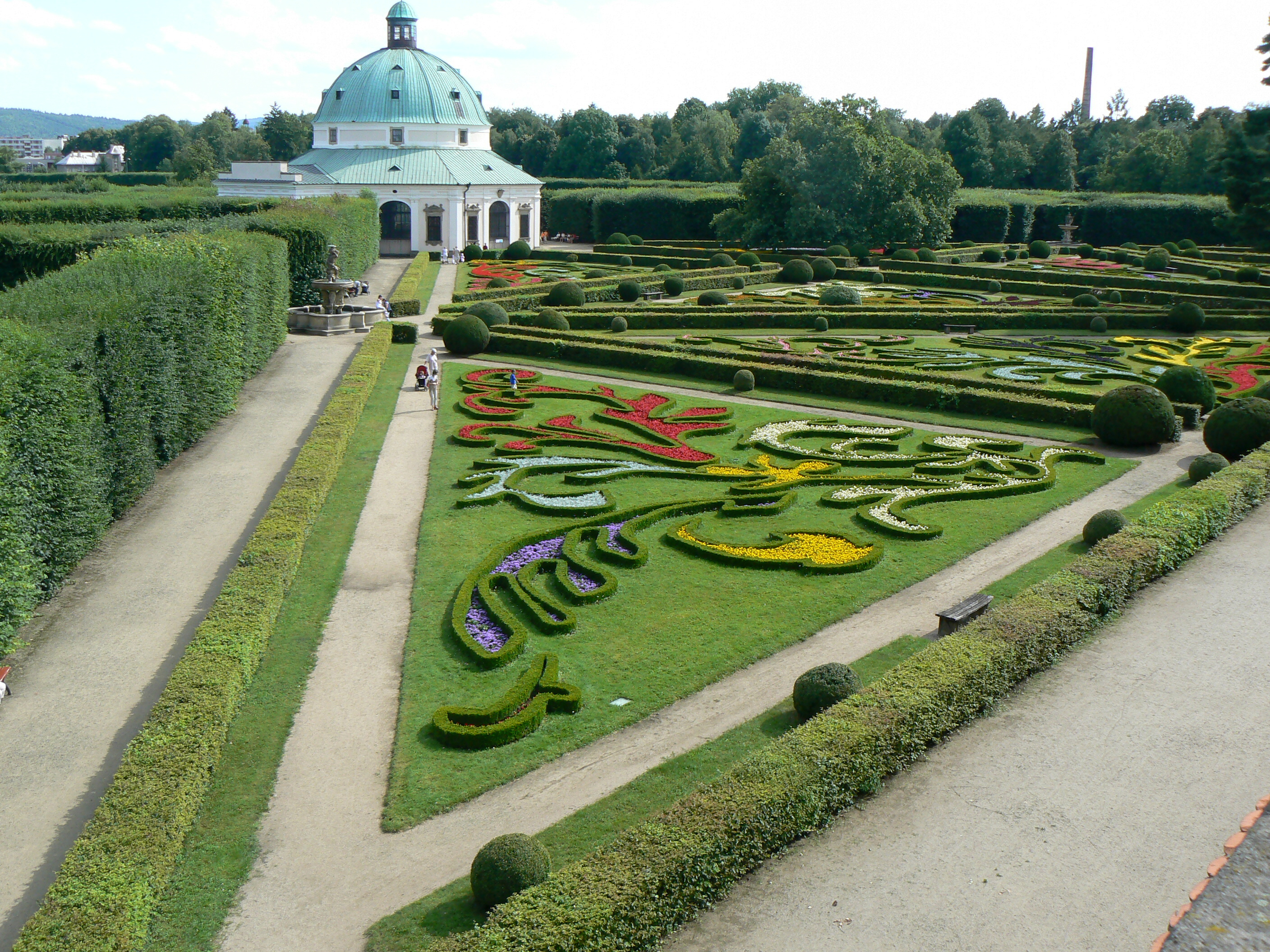
Castle gardens

The town is best known for Baroque Kroměříž Castle with its valuable gardens. The polygonal tower of the castle is the main landmark as well as the oldest remnant of the old Bishop's Castle. The gardens and castle at Kroměříž were added to the list of UNESCO World Heritage Sites in 1998.

Despite several reconstructions after the war damage, the Church of Saint Maurice retained its early Gothic appearance. Bishop Bruno von Schauenburg is buried in the church.

The Church of the Assumption of the Virgin Mary was the oldest church in the town. The original church from the 13th century was destroyed in the Thirty Years' War. The current structure was built in the late Baroque style the first half of the 18th century. It has preserved bell tower from the 13th century.

The town's main museum is Kroměříž Region Museum. There is also Karel Kryl's exposition on life and work of one of the most famous natives. In the former Bishop's Mint from 1665 is a mint exposition.

== In popular culture ==
Kroměříž Castle was used to film some scenes from Amadeus (1984), Immortal Beloved (1994), Četnické humoresky (1997), A Royal Affair (2012), Angélique (2013), The Musketeers (2015), and Maria Theresia (2017). Other films shot in the town include The Ear (1970) and Requiem pro panenku (1992).

== Notable people ==
- Jan Milíč (1320/1325–1374), ideal predecessor of Jan Hus
- Pavel Josef Vejvanovský (1633/1640–1693), baroque composer
- Heinrich Ignaz Franz Biber (1644–1704), composer and violinist
- Edmund Pascha (1714–1772), preacher, organist and composer
- Karel Josef Adolf (1715–1771), painter and restorer
- Václav Jan Frierenberger (1759–1823), general of the Napoleonic Wars
- Ferdinand Stoliczka (1838–1874), traveller, geologist and naturalist
- Max Švabinský (1873–1962), painter
- Hermann Pokorny (1882–1960), Austro-Hungarian cryptologist
- Václav Talich (1883–1961), conductor
- Jan Rypka (1886–1968), orientalist and translator
- Robert Land (1887–1942), film director
- Augustin Krist (1894–1964), football referee
- Martin Miller (1899–1969), actor
- Josef Silný (1902–1981), footballer
- Alexej Čepička (1910–1990), communist politician
- Jaroslav Koutecký (1922–2005), chemist
- Karel Prager (1923–2001), architect
- Miloš Macourek (1926–2002), screenwriter and writer
- Milan Pitlach (1943–2021), architect and photographer
- Karel Kryl (1944–1994), musician
- Boris Krajný (born 1945), pianist
- Josef Stejskal (born 1945), Czech-Australian artist
- Petr Uličný (born 1950), football player and manager
- Michal Peprník (born 1960), professor of American literature
- Pavel Štercl (born 1966), slalom canoeist
- Petr Štercl (born 1966), slalom canoeist
- Pavel Hapal (born 1969), football player and manager
- Pavel Novotný (born 1973), footballer
- Renata Berková (born 1975), triathlete
- Andrea Kalivodová (born 1977), opera singer
- Rytmus (born 1977), Slovak rapper
- Tomáš Břečka (born 1994), footballer
- Filip Chytil (born 1999), ice hockey player

== Twin towns – sister cities ==
Kroměříž is twinned with:

- Châteaudun, France
- Nitra, Slovakia
- Krems an der Donau, Austria
- Piekary Śląskie, Poland
- Râmnicu Vâlcea, Romania
- Ružomberok, Slovakia
