= Cabinet of Architecture =

Coordinates: 49°50′13.99″N 18°17′12.26″E

Cabinet of Architecture (Czech: Kabinet architektury) is a gallery and exhibition space in Ostrava, Czech Republic, founded in 2009.

== History ==
In 2009, the Society for Culture in Ostrava 2002–2013 (SPOK) and the Gallery of Fine Art in Ostrava (GVUO), which provided necessary exhibition space and logistical support for architectural exhibitions, founded the Cabinet of Architecture in the attic space of the Ostrava House of Art. Most exhibitions at the Cabinet of Architecture is accompanied by the publication of an illustrated catalogue.

Several Cabinet of Architecture exhibitions have been presented in other Czech cities including Brno, Kutná Hora, Litomyšl, and Prague, and also abroad, including Wrocław, Glivice, and Katovice in Poland, and Bratislava and Poprad in Slovakia.

In 2011, the Cabinet of Architecture was the first institution in the Czech Republic to be accepted into the International Confederation of Architectural Museums (ICAM).

== Publications and catalogues ==
- Prelovšek, Damjan; Strakoš, Martin: Architekt Oscar Niemeyer, Brasília. Politik Juscelino Kubitschek, Brasília – Slovo muže (catalogue), Ostrava 2009, ISBN 978-80-904096-1-3 (SPOK.Ostrava), ISBN 978-80-85091-88-5 (GVUO.Ostrava)
- Świechowski, Zygmunt; Gola, Agnieszka; Šťastná, Marie; Kuś, Wiesław: Gallia Romanica. Románská architektura a sochařství Francie ve fotografiích Zygmunda Świechowského (catalogue), Ostrava 2009, ISBN 978-80-904096-3-7 (SPOK.Ostrava), ISBN 978-80-85091-90-8 (GVUO.Ostrava)
- Trojhlavý drak / Trójgłowy smok / Dreiköpfiger Drache / 2009 (catalogue), Ostrava 2009, ISBN 978-80-904096-4-4 (SPOK.Ostrava), ISBN 978-80-85091-95-3 (GVUO.Ostrava)
- Stephan, Regina; Strakoš, Martin: Erich Mendelsohn. Dynamika a funkce, vize kosmopolitního architekta (catalogue), Ostrava 2009, ISBN 978-80-904096-2-0 (SPOK.Ostrava), ISBN 978-80-85091-89-2 (GVUO.Ostrava)
- Hanzlová, Alena (ed.): Kazuyo Sejima, Ryue Nishizawa / SANAA. Škola managementu a designu v Zollverein. THOMAS MAYER, Praha, Ostrava 2010, ISBN 978-80-903853-2-0 (Gaaleriie.net), ISBN 978-80-904096-6-8 (SPOK.Ostrava)
- Schneider, Romana: Mezinárodní vztahy. Mladí architekti z Německa (catalogue), Ostrava 2010, ISBN 978-80-904096-7-5 (SPOK.Ostrava), ISBN 978-80-87405-00-0 (GVUO.Ostrava)
- Goryczka, Tadeáš; Němec, Jaroslav (eds.): Daniel Libeskind. Architektura je řeč. Architektura jako język. Architecture Is a Language (catalogue), Ostrava 2010, ISBN 978-80-904096-8-2 (SPOK.Ostrava), ISBN 978-80-87405-02-4 (GVUO.Ostrava)
- Duda, Michał: Vratislav 20/20. Architektura 1990–2010 (catalogue), Ostrava 2010, ISBN 978-80-904096-9-9 (SPOK.Ostrava) ISBN 978-80-87405-05-5 (GVUO.Ostrava)
- Goryczka, Tadeáš; Němec, Jaroslav (eds.): Boris Podrecca. Architekt (catalogue), Ostrava 2011, ISBN 978-80-87508-00-8 (SPOK.Ostrava), ISBN 978-80-87405-07-9 (GVUO.Ostrava)
- Kapusta, Janusz; Borusiewicz, Mirosław; Kowalska, Bozena; Sztabiñski, Grzegorz: K-dron. Mezi uměním a matematikou. Janusz Kapusta. New York (catalogue), Ostrava 2011, ISBN 978-80-87508-01-5 (SPOK.Ostrava), ISBN 978-80-87405-10-9 (GVUO.Ostrava)
- Podreka, Gisela: Gisela Podreka Architektin (catalogue), Ostrava/Vídeň 2011, ISBN 978-80-87508-02-2 (SPOK.Ostrava)
- Strakoš, Martin: Radnice Slezské Ostravy jako vychýlený svorník mezi tradicí a moderností (The Silesian Ostrava Town Hall as a Deviated Mainpin between Tradition and Modernism). Ostrava 2011, ISBN 978-80-87508-03-9 (brož. s kovovým hřbetem), ISBN 978-80-87508-04-6 (brož.), ISBN 978-80-904096-0-6 (váz.)
- Goryczka, Tadeáš; Němec, Jaroslav (eds.): OFIS architekti 2002–2012 / inspirující limity (catalogue), Ostrava 2012, ISBN 978-80-87508-05-3 (SPOK.Ostrava), ISBN 978-80-87405-14-7 (GVUO.Ostrava)
- Goryczka, Tadeáš; Němec, Jaroslav (eds.): POST-OIL CITY. Historie budoucnosti města (catalogue), Ostrava 2012, ISBN 978-80-87508-07-7 (SPOK.Ostrava), ISBN 978-80-87405-16-1 (GVUO.Ostrava)
- Goryczka, Tadeáš; Němec, Jaroslav (eds.): TALLER: objekt – oděv. KDYŽ SE ODĚV SETKÁ S ARCHITEKTUROU. MARYLA SOBEK / Montreal (catalogue), Ostrava 2012, ISBN 978-80-87508-08-4 (SPOK.Ostrava), ISBN 978-80-87405-18-5 (GVUO.Ostrava)
- Heinz-Greenberg, Ita: Erich Mendelsohn ... ze života / ... Biografisches. Ostrava 2012, ISBN 978-80-87508-06-0
- Goryczka, Tadeáš; Němec, Jaroslav (eds.): Josip Plečnik : skici : Plečnikova Lublaň na architektonických skicách ze soukromé sbírky Damjana Prelovšeka = sketches : Plečnik's Ljubljana in architectural sketches from the private collection of Damjan Prelovšek = szkice : Lublana Plečnika w szkicach architektonicznych z kolekcji prywatnej Damjana Prelovšeka (catalogue), Ostrava 2013, ISBN 978-80-87508-10-7 (SPOK.Ostrava), ISBN 978-80-87405-21-5 (GVUO.Ostrava)
- Goryczka, Tadeáš; Němec, Jaroslav (eds.): Zvi Hecker (catalogue), Ostrava 2014, ISBN 978-80-87508-11-4 (SPOK.Ostrava), ISBN 978-80-87405-22-2 (GVUO.Ostrava)
