= Boris Krajný =

Czech pianist (born 1945)

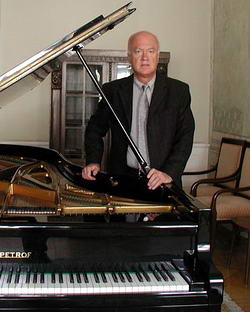
Boris Krajný

Boris Krajný (born 1945) is a Czech pianist, best known for his work on Czech and French pianism.

== Career and recognition ==
He was awarded the Académie Charles Cros's 1982 Grand Prix du Disque for his recording of Albert Roussel, Arthur Honegger and Francis Poulenc piano concertos.

He has also recorded Sergei Prokofiev and Béla Bartók's 3rd piano concertos together with Jiří Bělohlávek's Czech Philharmonic Orchestra and Maurice Ravel's complete piano works for Supraphon.

Krajný obtained an honourable mention at the 1975 Queen Elisabeth Music Competition.

He teaches at the Academy of Performing Arts in Prague.

Selected performance venues - Carnegie Hall, Teatro Colón, John F. Kennedy Center for the Performing Arts, Moscow Conservatory's Tchaikovsky Hall, Sydney Opera House, Wigmore Hall.
