= International Confederation of Architectural Museums =

Organization of architectural museums

The International Confederation of Architectural Museums (ICAM) is an organisation of architectural museums, centres and collections. It was founded in 1979.

== Members ==
Austria

- Architekturzentrum Wien

Canada

- Canadian Centre for Architecture

Czech Republic

- Cabinet of Architecture, Ostrava

Estonia

- Museum of Estonian Architecture

Finland

- Alvar Aalto Museum
- Museum of Finnish Architecture

France

- Cité de l'Architecture et du Patrimoine

Germany

- Bauhaus Dessau Foundation
- German Architecture Museum

Latvia

- Latvian Museum of Architecture

Poland

- Museum of Architecture, Wrocław

Slovenia
- Museum of Architecture and Design
Sweden

- Swedish Centre for Architecture and Design

Switzerland

- Swiss Architecture Museum

United Kingdom

- Sir John Soane's Museum
- University of Brighton Design Archives
- Victoria and Albert Museum

United States

- Avery Architectural and Fine Arts Library, Columbia University
- Chicago Architecture Foundation
- Fallingwater Museum
- Harvard Design School
- The Museum of Modern Art
- The Athenaeum of Philadelphia
- The Getty Research Institute
- The Heinz Architectural Center Carnegie Museum of Art
- The Library of Congress
- The MIT Museum
- The Wolfsonian–Florida International University
- University Art Museum, UCSB
- University of California, Berkeley Environmental Design Archives
- University of Pennsylvania
- Virginia Center for Architecture at Branch House, Richmond, Virginia
- Yale University
- A+D Museum in Los Angeles
- Richard Meier & Partners Architects Model Museum
