= Zborovice =

- Municipality
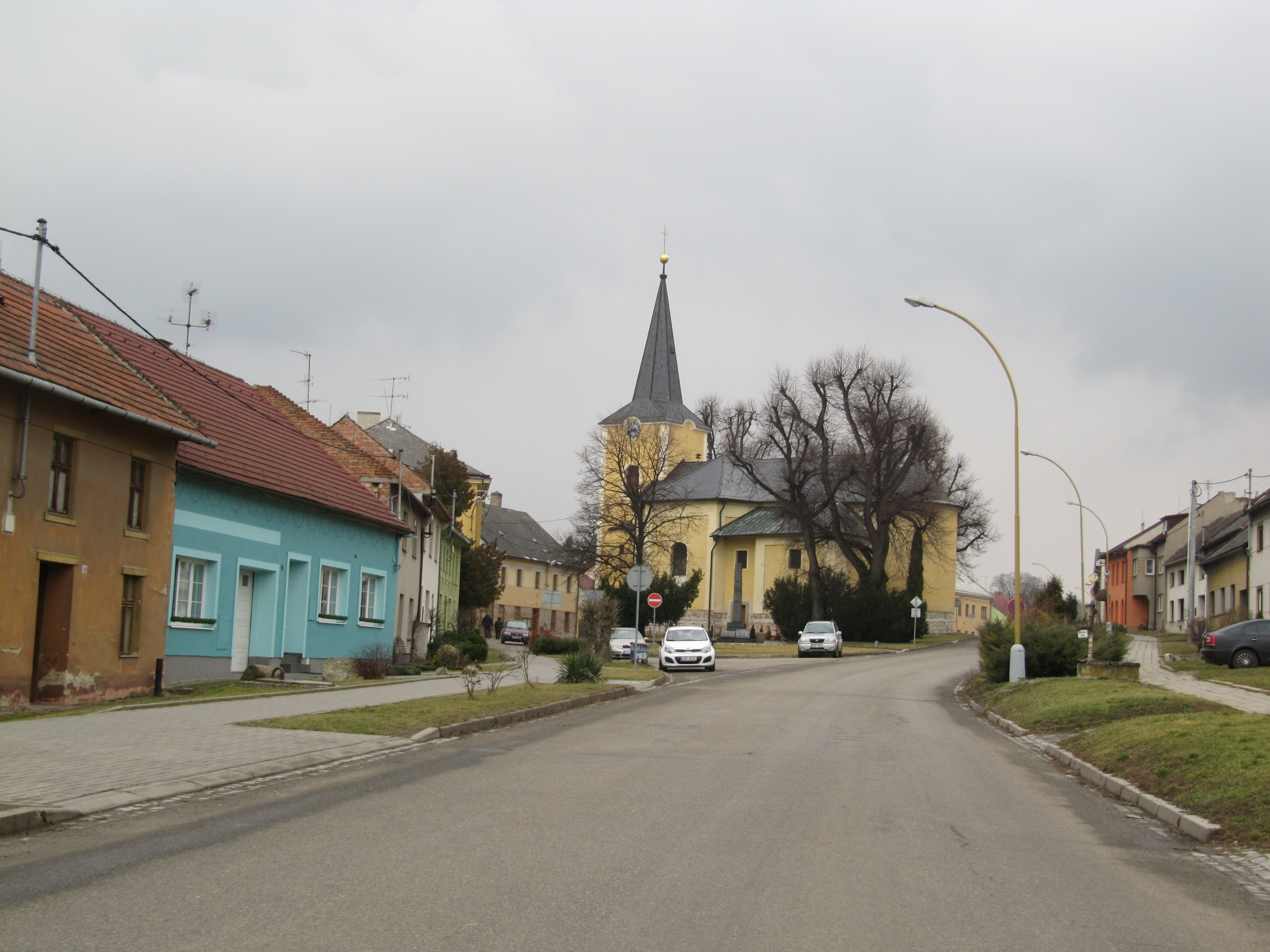
- Centre of Zborovice

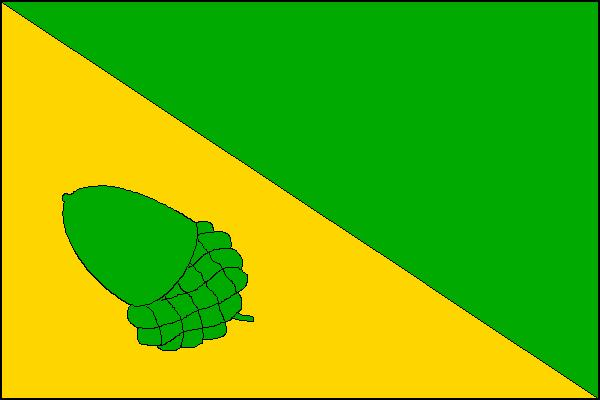
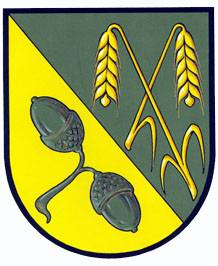
- Flag Coat of arms

- Location in the Czech Republic
- Coordinates: 49°14′56″N 17°17′5″E
- Country: Czech Republic
- Region: Zlín
- District: Kroměříž
- First mentioned: 1276

Area
  - Total: 12.23 km^{2} (4.72 sq mi)
- Elevation: 247 m (810 ft)

Population (2026-01-01)
  - Total: 1,448
  - Density: 118.4/km^{2} (306.6/sq mi)
- Time zone: UTC+1 (CET)
  - Summer (DST): UTC+2 (CEST)
- Postal code: 768 32
- Website: www.obeczborovice.cz

Zborovice is a municipality and village in Kroměříž District in the Zlín Region of the Czech Republic. It has about 1,400 inhabitants.

== Administrative division ==
Zborovice consists of two municipal parts (in brackets population according to the 2021 census):

- Zborovice (1,170)
- Medlov (194)

== Geography ==
Zborovice is located about 9 kilometres (6 mi) southwest of Kroměříž and 27 km (17 mi) west of Zlín. It lies in the Litenčice Hills. The highest point is the hill Troják at 397 m (1,302 ft) above sea level.

== History ==
The first written mention of Zborovice is from 1276, but settlement in the area extends far further into the past. This has been proven by archaeological excavations in a nearby village, 10th century earrings and rings were found.

In the mid-19th century, sugar beet growing spread in the region and a sugar factory was established in Zborovice. In 1881, the railway to Kroměříž was built for the transportation of sugar pulp.

== Demographics ==
Historical population

Year	Pop.	±%
1869	1,183	—
1880	1,507	+27.4%
1890	1,593	+5.7%
1900	1,659	+4.1%
1910	1,860	+12.1%

Year	Pop.	±%
1921	1,884	+1.3%
1930	1,790	−5.0%
1950	1,620	−9.5%
1961	1,764	+8.9%
1970	1,727	−2.1%

Year	Pop.	±%
1980	1,603	−7.2%
1991	1,539	−4.0%
2001	1,614	+4.9%
2011	1,533	−5.0%
2021	1,364	−11.0%

Source: Censuses

== Economy ==
In the 20th century, the sugar factory was rebuilt and today saw blades are produced there.

== Transport ==
Zborovice is the terminus and starting point of the railway line from/to Bystřice pod Hostýnem.

== Education ==
In Zborovice is a primary school and kindergarten.

== Sights ==
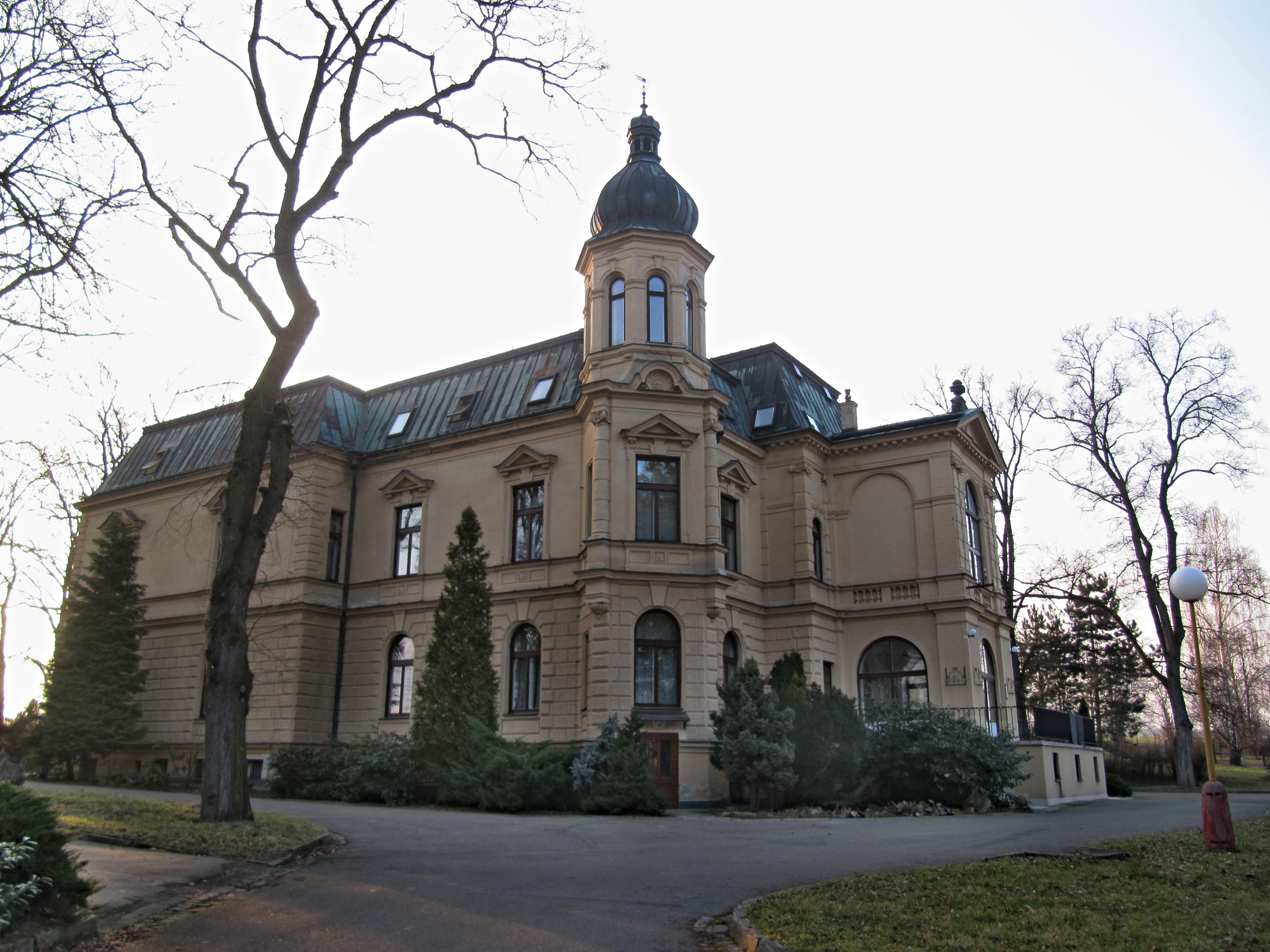
Nový zámek

The main landmarks of Zborovice are the church and the castle. The Church of Saint Bartholomew was built in the Baroque style in second half of the 17th century, on the site of an older church.

The Zborovice Castle was originally a fortress, rebuilt into the Baroque castle in the 18th century. Later it was rebuilt in the Neoclassical style. In 1890–1891, the so-called Nový zámek ('new castle') was built next to the original castle (now called Starý zámek, i.e. 'old castle'). The castle is surrounded by a landscape park. A part of the castle complex is also the architecturally valuable tomb of the Friess family. Today the castle houses a home for the disabled.
