= Stern (surname) =

Surname list

Stern is a surname which can be of either German/Yiddish or English language origin, though the former case predominates.

The English version of the surname was used as a nickname for someone who was strict, austere, harsh, or stern in character. The German/Yiddish word Stern means "star".

== People ==
- Adam Stern (born 1980), Canadian Major League Baseball player
- Adam Stern (conductor) (born 1955), American conductor
- Adolf Stern (1835–1907), German literary historian and poet
- Adolf Stern (chess player) (1849–1907), German chess player
- Adolphe Stern (1848–1931), Romanian lawyer and politician
- Alan Stern (born 1957), American engineer and planetary scientist
- Albert Stern (violinist), American violinist
- Albert Gerald Stern (1878–1966), banker and member of Landships committee
- Anatol Stern (1899–1968), Polish writer
- Andy Stern (born 1950), American president of the Service Employees International Union
- Avraham Stern (1907–1942), founder and leader of the "Stern Gang" (Lehi)
- Avraham Stern (politician) (1935–1997), Israeli politician
- Bill Stern (1907–1971), American sports announcer in the Radio Hall of Fame
- Casey Stern (born 1978), American baseball journalist
- Clara Stern (1877–1945), German-American psychologist
- Curt Stern (1902–1981), German-born American Drosophila and human geneticist
- Daniel Stern (actor) (born 1957), American television and film actor
- Daniel Stern (psychologist) (1934–2012), American psychoanalytic theorist, specialising in infant development
- David Stern (disambiguation)
- Edna Stern (born 1977), Belgian-Israeli pianist
- Édouard Stern (1954–2005), French banker
- Elazar Stern (born 1956), Israeli general
- Elena Stern (born 1994), Swiss curler
- Eric Stern (musician) (born 1971), musician from Portland, Oregon
- Erich C. Stern (1879–1969), American lawyer and politician
- Ephraim Stern (1934–2018), Israeli archaeologist
- Frances Stern (1873–1947), American nutritionist
- Frederick Claude Stern (1884–1967), English botanist and horticulturalist
- Fritz Stern (1926–2016), German-born American historian of German history, Jewish history and historiography
- Georges Stern (1882–1928), French jockey
- Gerald Stern (1925–2022), American poet
- Gladys Bronwyn Stern (1890–1973), English writer
- Grace Mary Stern (1925–1998), American politician
- Guy Stern (1922–2023), German-American educator and writer
- Hans Stern (1922–2007), German-born Brazilian jeweler
- Harold P. Stern (1922–1977), American art historian
- Hellmut Stern (1928–2020), German violinist
- Henry Stern (disambiguation)
- Herman Stern (1887–1980), American businessman
- Hermann Stern (1878–1952), Austrian lawyer and politician
- Hermann de Stern (1815–1887), German-born British banker.
- Howard Stern (born 1954), American radio and TV personality
- Howard K. Stern (born 1968), American attorney and unofficial husband of Anna Nicole Smith
- Irving Stern (1928–2023), American politician
- Isaac Stern (1920–2001), Ukrainian-born American violinist
- Itzhak Stern (1901–1969), accountant of Oskar Schindler
- Ivo Stern (1889–1961), Croatian lawyer, writer, journalist, director and founder of the "Zagreb Radiostation" (now Croatian Radiotelevision)
- Jacques Stern (cryptographer) (born 1949), French computer scientist and cryptologist
- Jacques Stern (politician) (1882–1949), French politician
- Jared Stern, American screenwriter
- Jean Stern (fencer) (1875–1962), French Olympic champion épée fencer
- Jean Stern (art historian) (born 1946), art historian and museum director
- Jenna Stern, American actress
- Jennifer Stern, American planetary geochemist
- Josef Stern (1797–1871), Austrian pastor and beekeeper
- Josef Luitpold Stern (1886–1966), Austrian author
- Judith S. Stern (1943–2019), American nutritionist
- Julius Stern (1820–1883), German musician and educator
- Karoline Stern (1800–1887), German opera soprano
- Karl Stern (1905–1975), German-Canadian neurologist, psychiatrist, theologian and author
- Leonard B. Stern (1923–2011), American television producer, director and writer
- Leonard J. Stern (1904–1988), American judge from Ohio
- Leonard N. Stern (born 1938), American business executive
- Leo Stern (musician) (1862–1904), English-German cellist
- Leo Stern (historian) (1901–1982) Austrian-German political activist, historian and university rector
- Lina Stern (1878–1968), biochemist, physiologist and humanist
- Louise Stern (born 1978), American writer and artist
- Manfred Stern (1896–1954), international spy and member of the GRU, Soviet military intelligence
- Marcus Stern (journalist) (born 1953), Pulitzer Prize winning reporter
- Marcus Stern (theatre director), associate director of the American Repertory Theater
- Mario Rigoni Stern (1921–2008), Italian writer
- Max Emanuel Stern (1811–1873), writer, poet and translator
- Melissa Stern, also known as Baby M (born 1986)
- Michael Stern (disambiguation)
- Mike Stern (born 1953), American jazz guitarist
- Mikhail Stern (1918–2005), Soviet dissident
- Milton R. Stern (1928–2011), American professor of American literature
- Miroslava Stern (1926–1955), Mexican actress of Czech origin
- Moritz Abraham Stern (1807–1894), German mathematician
- Nicholas Stern (born 1946), British economist
- Nicolas Stern (born 1965), American film producer
- Otto Stern (1888–1969), German physicist and Nobel laureate
- Paul Stern (1892–1948), Austrian diplomat and bridge player
- Philippe Stern (1895–1979), French art historian
- Richard Stern (disambiguation)
- Ricki Stern, American film director, screenwriter, producer, and author
- Robert Stern (disambiguation)
  - Robert A. M. Stern (1939–2025), American architect, educator, and author
- Ronald J. Stern (born 1947), American mathematician
- Ronnie Stern (born 1967), Canadian ice hockey player
- Rose Stern (1869–1953), first British woman member of the Royal Institute of Chemistry
- Rudi Stern (1936–2006), American multimedia artist
- Sam Stern (born 1990), British celebrity chef
- Samuel Miklos Stern (1920–1969), Hungarian–British Orientalist
- Selma Stern (1890–1981), German historian
- Tom Stern (cinematographer) (born 1946), American cinematographer
- Tom Stern (filmmaker) (born 1965), film and television writer and director
- Vernon M. Stern (1923–2006), American entomologist
- Victor Stern (1885–1958), Austrian philosopher and politician
- Vivien Stern, Baroness Stern (born 1941), British expert on criminal justice and penal reform
- William Stern (psychologist) (1871–1938), German psychologist, inventor of the concept of IQ
- William Joseph Stern (1891–1965), British physicist
- Stern family, a prominent banking family

== Fictional characters ==
- Ulrich Stern, in the French animated television series Code Lyoko
- Jon Stern, Daniel Holden's Justice Row attorney in the television series Rectify

== See also ==
- Justice Stern (disambiguation)
- Davor Štern (born 1947), former Minister of Economy, Labour and Entrepreneurship in the Croatian Government, businessman and entrepreneur
- Grigory Shtern (1900–1941), Soviet military commander
- Yohanan Petrovsky-Shtern (born 1962), Jewish early modern historian and philologist
- Stearn, surname
- Sterns (surname)
- Stern (given name)
