= Leonard Stern =

Leonard Stern may refer to:

- Leonard B. Stern (1923–2011), American television producer, director and writer
- Leonard N. Stern (born 1938), American business executive
- Leonard J. Stern, Ohio Supreme Court judge

== See also ==
- Leo Stern (musician) (1862–1904), English-German cellist
- Leo Stern (historian) (1901–1982) Austrian-German political activist, historian and university rector
- Stern (surname)
