= Flaying of Marsyas =

The Flaying of Marsyas is the death of Marsyas in ancient Greek mythology. It may refer to a number of works of art depicting the scene, including:

- Flaying of Marsyas (Titian), a painting by Titian of the 1570s.
- Flaying of Marsyas (Bronzino), a painting by Bronzino, c. 1531
