= Leo Stern =

Leo Stern may refer to:

- Leo Stern (musician)
- Leo Stern (historian)
