= 2026 Moto4 Northern Cup =

Motorcycle road racing season

2026 Moto4 Northern Cup
Previous:	2025	Next:	2027

The 2026 Moto4 Northern Cup was the seventh season of the competition, formerly known as the Northern Talent Cup, a motorcycle racing series organized by Dorna, which is intended for young riders from central and northern European countries. The season consisted of 14 races held over 7 meetings, beginning on 19 April at TT Circuit Assen and ending on 20 September at the same venue.

German Robin Siegert was crowned champion during the Oschersleben round.

== Entry list ==
The entry list including the newly selected riders and returning riders was released on 13 January 2026. All riders compete on identical 250cc Honda NSF250R motorcycles and use series-specified Pirelli tyres.

Team	No.	Rider	Status	Rounds
(Denmark) ARE Racing	6	(Denmark) Anton Eilersen		All
(Czech Republic) AV79 Racing Team	79	(Czech Republic) Adam Vyskočil		All
(Netherlands) Douma Racing	41	(Netherlands) Douwe Douma	R	All
(Finland) DPR Team	46	(Finland) Domi Pekkanen		1–3, 7
(Czech Republic) FS12 Racing Team	7	(Czech Republic) Roman Durdis		All
(Germany) Hinkelmann DH 14 Racing	14	(Germany) Danny Hinkelmann	R	All
(Hungary) HRLF Promotion	5	(Hungary) Tamás Lukács		3–5
(Netherlands) Jaylen Korporaal Racing	95	(Netherlands) Jaylen Korporaal		All
(Belgium) Junior Black Knights	54	(Belgium) Miro Masson	R	All
(Belgium) Junior Black Knights	72	(Belgium) Junior Deschouwer	R	All
(Belgium) Junior Black Knights	73	(Belgium) Zelko Avart	R	5
(Germany) Kiefer Racing	10	(Germany) Louis Wolff	R	All
(Germany) Kiefer Racing	11	(Germany) Robin Siegert		All
(France) KRZ Racing Team	71	(France) William Krzelj		1–3, 5–7
(Germany) LM-RacingTeam	42	(Germany) Fillin Lorenz		7
(Germany) Mass Sports Racing by JRP Motorsport	4	(Netherlands) Casper Pennings	R	All
(Germany) Mass Sports Racing by JRP Motorsport	21	(Germany) Anina Urlass		All
(Netherlands) Nijenhuis Racing Products	22	(Netherlands) Quinn de Joode		7
(Germany) Ole Säuberlich	5	(Germany) Ole Säuberlich		7
(Germany) Racing Team Rudolph	93	(Germany) Jason Rudolph		All
(Netherlands) RN LF Racing Team	33	(Netherlands) Levi Flier	R	All
(Netherlands) RN LF Racing Team	88	(Netherlands) Ruben Nijland		All
(France) Swan96	96	(France) Swan Emprin		All
(Germany) Team Freudenberg–Paligo Racing	24	(Germany) Smilla Göttlich	R	All
(Germany) Team NSA	17	(Germany) Thias Wenzel		All
(Denmark) Team William	12	(Denmark) William Ruby	R	1–2, 6–7
(Germany) Tudor Racing	78	(Germany) Tudor Dedea		All
(Czech Republic) ZC Racing s.r.o.	2	(Czech Republic) Viktor Čech	R	All
(Belgium) Zenno58	58	(Belgium) Zenno Bulté		All

Icon	Status
R	Rookie

== Calendar ==
The calendar was released on 20 November 2025.

Round	Circuit	Date	Support For	Map of circuit locations
1	(Netherlands) TT Circuit Assen, Assen	17–19 April	Superbike World Championship	2026 Moto4 Northern Cup is located in Central Europe
2	(Germany) Sachsenring, Hohenstein-Ernstthal	8–10 May	EuroMoto	2026 Moto4 Northern Cup is located in Central Europe
3	(Hungary) Balaton Park Circuit, Balatonfőkajár	5–7 June	MotoGP World Championship	2026 Moto4 Northern Cup is located in Central Europe
4	(Czech Republic) Autodrom Brno, Brno	19–21 June	MotoGP World Championship	2026 Moto4 Northern Cup is located in Central Europe
5	(Germany) Sachsenring, Hohenstein-Ernstthal	10–12 July	MotoGP World Championship	2026 Moto4 Northern Cup is located in Central Europe
6	(Germany) Motopark Oschersleben, Oschersleben	31 July–2 August	EuroMoto	2026 Moto4 Northern Cup is located in Central Europe
7	(Netherlands) TT Circuit Assen, Assen	18–20 September	British Superbike Championship	2026 Moto4 Northern Cup is located in Central Europe

== Race results ==
Round		Circuit	Pole position	Fastest lap	Winning rider	Winning team
1	R1	(Netherlands) TT Circuit Assen, Assen	(Germany) Anina Urlass	(Germany) Anina Urlass	(Germany) Thias Wenzel	(Germany) Team NSA
1	R2	(Netherlands) TT Circuit Assen, Assen	(Germany) Anina Urlass	(Netherlands) Jaylen Korporaal	(Germany) Anina Urlass	(Germany) Mass Sports Racing by JRP Motorsport
2	R1	(Germany) Sachsenring, Hohenstein-Ernstthal	(Germany) Anina Urlass	(Germany) Thias Wenzel	(Germany) Robin Siegert	(Germany) Kiefer Racing
2	R2	(Germany) Sachsenring, Hohenstein-Ernstthal	(Germany) Anina Urlass	(Germany) Robin Siegert	(Germany) Robin Siegert	(Germany) Kiefer Racing
3	R1	(Hungary) Balaton Park Circuit, Balatonfőkajár	(Germany) Anina Urlass	(Germany) Robin Siegert	(Germany) Robin Siegert	(Germany) Kiefer Racing
3	R2	(Hungary) Balaton Park Circuit, Balatonfőkajár	(Germany) Anina Urlass	(Germany) Robin Siegert	(Germany) Robin Siegert	(Germany) Kiefer Racing
4	R1	(Czech Republic) Autodrom Brno, Brno	(Germany) Robin Siegert	(Germany) Anina Urlass	(Germany) Robin Siegert	(Germany) Kiefer Racing
4	R2	(Czech Republic) Autodrom Brno, Brno	(Germany) Robin Siegert	(Germany) Anina Urlass	(Germany) Robin Siegert	(Germany) Kiefer Racing
5	R1	(Germany) Sachsenring, Hohenstein-Ernstthal	(Germany) Robin Siegert	(Germany) Robin Siegert	(Germany) Robin Siegert	(Germany) Kiefer Racing
5	R2	(Germany) Sachsenring, Hohenstein-Ernstthal	(Germany) Robin Siegert	(Germany) Robin Siegert	(Germany) Robin Siegert	(Germany) Kiefer Racing
6	R1	(Germany) Motopark Oschersleben, Oschersleben	(Germany) Thias Wenzel	(Germany) Robin Siegert	(Germany) Robin Siegert	(Germany) Kiefer Racing
6	R2	(Germany) Motopark Oschersleben, Oschersleben	(Germany) Robin Siegert	(Germany) Anina Urlass	(Germany) Robin Siegert	(Germany) Kiefer Racing
7	R1	(Netherlands) TT Circuit Assen, Assen	(Czech Republic) Adam Vyskočil	(Belgium) Miro Masson	(Germany) Robin Siegert	(Germany) Kiefer Racing
7	R2	(Netherlands) TT Circuit Assen, Assen	(Czech Republic) Adam Vyskočil	(Czech Republic) Viktor Čech	(Germany) Anina Urlass	(Germany) Mass Sports Racing by JRP Motorsport

== Championship standings ==
Scoring system
Points are awarded to the top fifteen finishers. A rider has to finish the race to earn points.

Position	1st	2nd	3rd	4th	5th	6th	7th	8th	9th	10th	11th	12th	13th	14th	15th
Points	25	20	16	13	11	10	9	8	7	6	5	4	3	2	1

Pos	Rider	ASS (Netherlands)		SAC (Germany)		BAL (Hungary)		BRN (Czech Republic)		SAC (Germany)		OSC (Germany)		ASS (Netherlands)		Pts
Pos	Rider	R1	R2	R1	R2	R1	R2	R1	R2	R1	R2	R1	R2	R1	R2	Pts
1	(Germany) Robin Siegert	3	4	1	1^{F}	1^{F}	1^{F}	1^{P}	1^{P}	1^{P F}	1^{P F}	1^{F}	1^{P}	1	3	320
2	(Germany) Anina Urlass	2^{P F}	1^{P}	2^{P}	2^{P}	DSQ^{P}	DSQ^{P}	2^{F}	2^{F}	3	2	9	7^{F}	10	1	208
3	(Germany) Thias Wenzel	1	2	3^{F}	3	2	Ret	4	5	2	3	Ret^{P}	6	DNS	8	175
4	(Czech Republic) Roman Durdis	Ret	DNS	10	5	3	2	5	3	6	8	2	2	13	7	150
5	(Czech Republic) Adam Vyskočil	7	Ret	4	7	4	3	9	12	4	Ret	5	3	6^{P}	2^{P}	141
6	(France) Swan Emprin	DSQ	7	8	Ret	12	7	8	4	5	4	3	9	18	5	109
7	(Netherlands) Jaylen Korporaal	DSQ	3^{F}	Ret	8	5	6	3	7	Ret	13	4	10	Ret	10	98
8	(Germany) Danny Hinkelmann	8	9	6	4	6	10	6	6	Ret	5	7	13	16	Ret	97
9	(Netherlands) Ruben Nijland	5	5	5	6	11	8	22	17	14	14	8	8	9	9	90
10	(Germany) Jason Rudolph	12	Ret	11	10	7	4	16	15	9	11	11	15	7	4	78
11	(Czech Republic) Viktor Čech	15	12	16	15	15	9	7	9	10	10	14	5	11	6^{F}	70
12	(Belgium) Zenno Bulté	6	10	12	12	14	17	15	10	Ret	16	12	11	4	Ret	55
13	(Netherlands) Casper Pennings	14	Ret	9	9	DSQ	DSQ	11	8	Ret	7	Ret	4	Ret	Ret	51
14	(Denmark) Anton Eilersen	10	16	7	14	8	Ret	18	16	Ret	19	6	14	14	15	40
15	(Germany) Smilla Göttlich	Ret	Ret	15	DNS	10	5	10	14	Ret	20	Ret	12	Ret	12	34
16	(Belgium) Miro Masson	16	Ret	22	16	Ret	12	19	18	8	15	Ret	16	2^{F}	16	33
17	(Finland) Domi Pekkanen	4	6	Ret	DNS	18	15							8	Ret	32
18	(Netherlands) Levi Flier	13	11	18	13	Ret	14	20	19	13	12	Ret	18	5	Ret	31
19	(Germany) Louis Wolff	18	15	17	11	9	Ret	12	22	11	9	Ret	19	Ret	19	29
20	(Hungary) Tamás Lukács					16	13	13	13	7	6					28
21	(Germany) Tudor Dedea	11	8	14	19	13	16	17	20	16	17	10	17	12	Ret	28
22	(Belgium) Junior Deschouwer	Ret	13	19	17	17	11	14	11	12	18	Ret	Ret	17	11	24
23	(Netherlands) Quinn de Joode													3	17	16
24	(France) William Krzelj	9	Ret	13	Ret	Ret	19			Ret	23	13	20	DNS	DNS	13
25	(Netherlands) Douwe Douma	17	14	20	18	19	18	21	21	17	21	Ret	21	19	13	5
26	(Germany) Fillin Lorenz													Ret	14	2
27	(Germany) Ole Säuberlich													15	22	1
28	(Belgium) Zelko Avart									15	22					1
29	(Denmark) William Ruby	19	17	21	20							Ret	Ret	20	Ret	0
Pos	Rider	ASS (Netherlands)		SAC (Germany)		BAL (Hungary)		BRN (Czech Republic)		SAC (Germany)		OSC (Germany)		ASS (Netherlands)		Pts
