= Kroměříž Castle =

UNESCO World Heritage Site
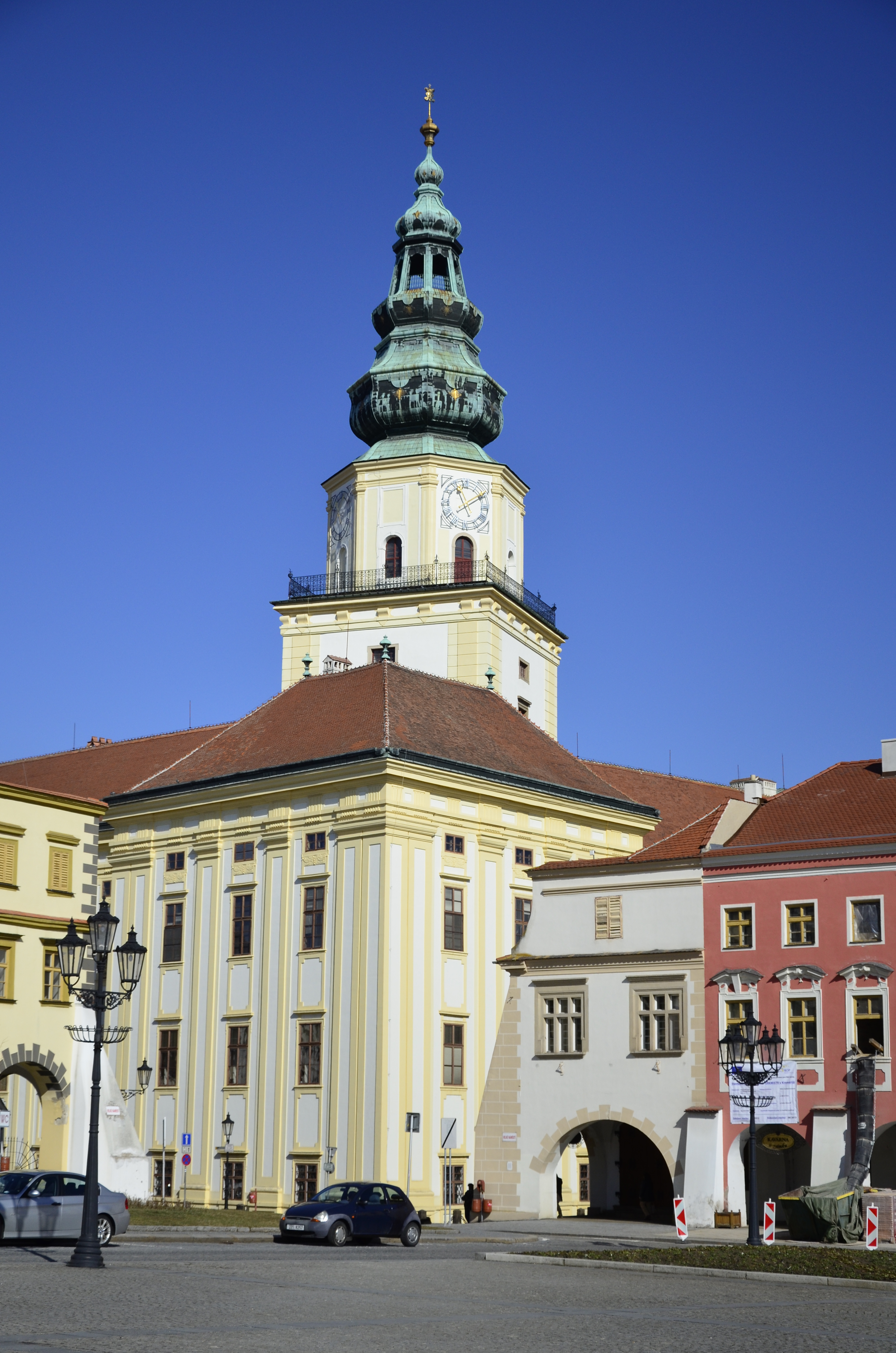
- This medieval tower of Kroměříž Castle was capped by a decorative drum and spire during the Baroque renovation in the 17th century.

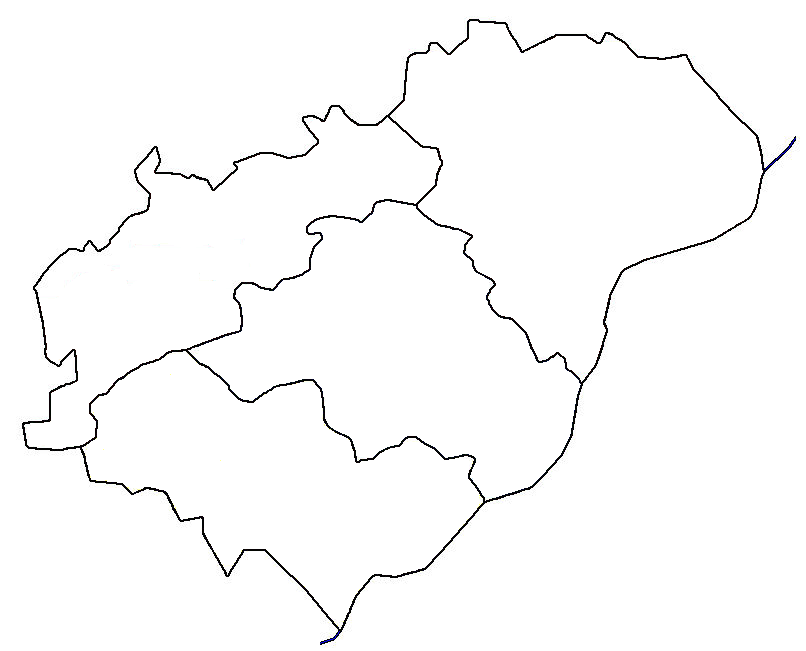
- Location within Zlín Region Location within Czech Republic
- Official name: Gardens and Castle at Kroměříž
- Location: Kroměříž, Zlín Region, Czech Republic
- Includes: 1. Castle Garden and Castle; 2. Pleasure Garden
- Criteria: Cultural: (ii), (iv)
- Reference: 860
- Inscription: 1998 (22nd Session)
- Area: 74.5 ha (184 acres)
- Buffer zone: 441 ha (1,090 acres)
- Coordinates: 49°18′0″N 17°22′38″E

Kroměříž Castle (Czech: Zámek Kroměříž or Arcibiskupský zámek, German: Schloss Kremsier) is a castle in Kroměříž in the Czech Republic. It used to be the principal residence of the bishops and (from 1777) archbishops of Olomouc. UNESCO listed the gardens and castle as a World Heritage Site in 1998 because of its exceptionally well-preserved and outstanding Baroque gardens.

== History ==
The town was owned by the bishops from the 13th century. During the Hussite wars they lost control, and regained it only in the 1470s. This prompted the replacement of the castle with a more comfortable residence by bishop Stanislav I Thurzo in 1500. The building was in the late Gothic style, with a modicum of Renaissance detail. During the Thirty Years' War, the castle was sacked by the Swedish army (1643).

It was not until 1664 that a bishop from the powerful Lichtenstein-Kastelkorn family charged architect Filiberto Lucchese with renovating the palace in a Baroque style. The chief monument of Lucchese's work in Kroměříž is the Pleasure Garden in front of the castle. Upon Lucchese's death in 1666, Giovanni Pietro Tencalla completed his work on the formal garden and had the palace rebuilt in a style reminiscent of the Turinese school to which he belonged.

After the castle was gutted by a major fire in March 1752, Bishop Hamilton commissioned two leading imperial artists, Franz Anton Maulbertsch and Josef Stern to decorate the halls of the palace with their works. In addition to their paintings, the palace still houses an art collection, generally considered the second finest in the country, which includes Titian's last mythological painting, The Flaying of Marsyas. The largest part of the collection was acquired by Bishop Karel in Cologne in 1673. The palace also contains an outstanding musical archive and a library of 33,000 volumes.

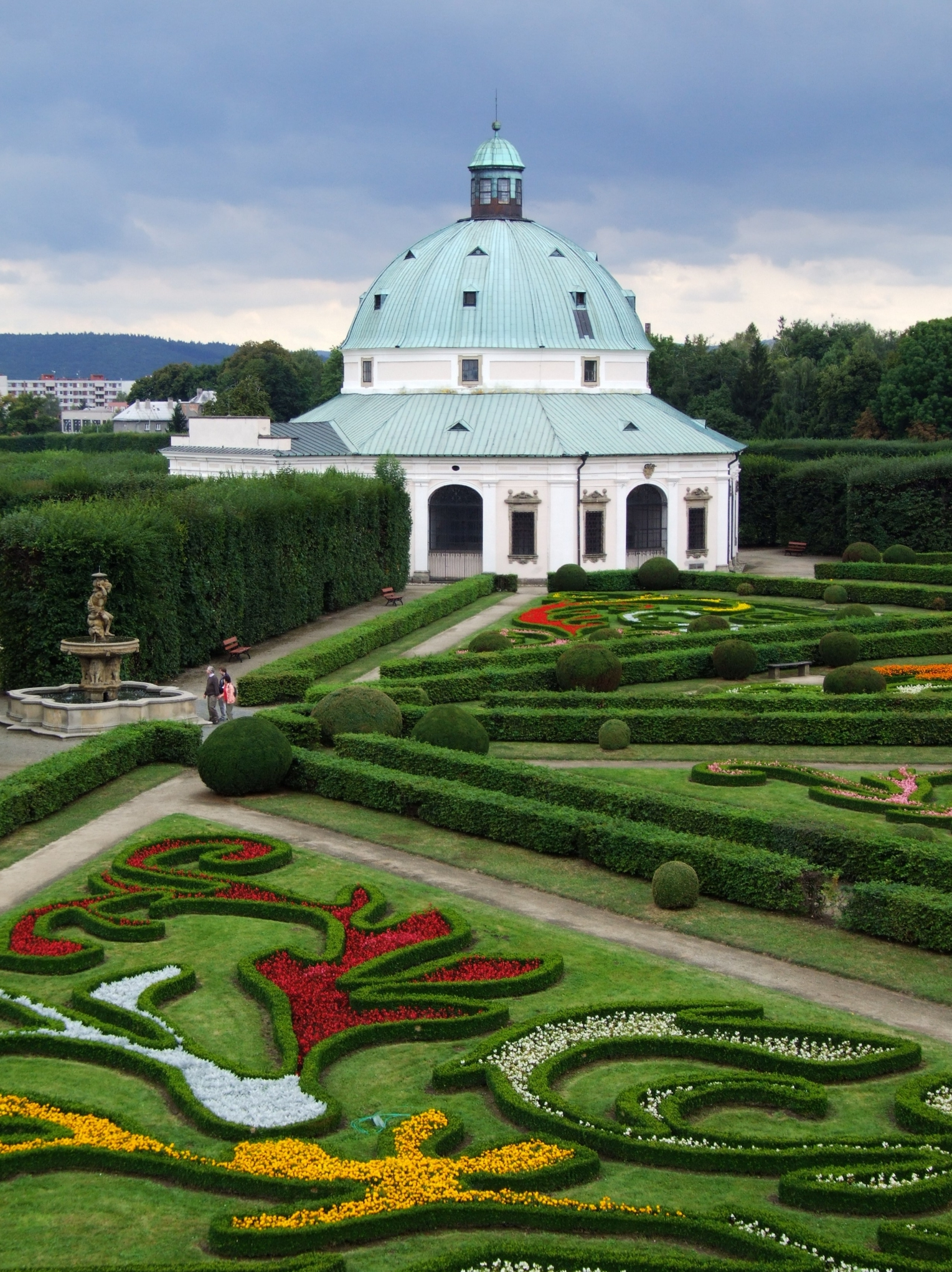
Baroque flower garden

== Landscape architecture and architecture ==
The castle and its grounds were nominated for the World Heritage List in 1998. As the nomination dossier explains, "the castle is a good but not outstanding example of a type of aristocratic or princely residence that has survived widely in Europe. The Pleasure Garden, by contrast, is a very rare and largely intact example of a Baroque garden". The Baroque landscapes and palaces of Bohemia and Moravia were heavily influenced by the Italian Baroque, although in the layout of this Pleasure Garden on a largely flat site, the influence of the French Formal Baroque style is also visible. Two Italian architects were responsible for the design and execution of the site: Filiberto Luchese (1607–1666) and after his death Giovanni Pietro Tencalla (1629–1702).

The Baroque Pleasure or Lust Garden is located at a distance from the Palace, as can be seen today from aerial photography. The engravings, completed in 1691 by Georg Matthaeus Vischer, show a fully enclosed garden divided into half ornamental parterre and the other half to the south composed of orchards and productive ornamental features.

Apart from the formal Baroque parterres there is also a less formal 19th-century English garden close to the palace, which sustained damage during floods in 1997.

== In popular culture ==
Interiors of the palace were extensively used by Miloš Forman as a stand-in for Vienna's Hofburg Imperial Palace during filming of Amadeus (1984), based on the life of Wolfgang Amadeus Mozart, who actually never visited Kroměříž, although some of his compositions are stored in the music archive of the castle. There are more films / series which were shot (at least partially) in the palace and/or gardens.

| Year | Film / series |
|---|---|
| 2019 | Whiskey Cavalier |
| 2017 | Maria Theresa |
| 2014 | The Musketeers |
| 2016 | Satisfaction 1720 |
| 2014 | Ekaterina |
| 2013 | Angélique |
| 2012 | A Royal Affair |
| 2010 | Chateaubriand |
| 2012 | La figlia del capitano |
| 2002 | Trenck |
| 2002 | Napoléon |
| 1999 | Michael Strogoff |
| 1994 | Immortal Beloved |
| 1992 | The Young Indiana Jones Chronicles |
| 1991 | The Frog Prince |
| 1984 | Amadeus |

== See also ==
- List of Baroque residences
