= Robert A. Stern (neuropsychologist) =

American neuropsychologist

- Born: November 24, 1958
- Education: Wesleyan University; University of Rhode Island
- Scientific career
- Workplaces: Boston University School of Medicine

Robert A. Stern (born November 24, 1958) is professor of Neurology, Neurosurgery, and Anatomy & Neurobiology at Boston University School of Medicine, where he is also director of clinical research for the BU Chronic Traumatic Encephalopathy (CTE) Center. From 2010 to 2019, he was the director of the Clinical Core of the BU Alzheimer's Disease Center (funded by National Institutes of Health, NIH).

A major focus of Stern's research involves the long-term effects of repetitive brain trauma in athletes, including the neurodegenerative disease, CTE. He has been funded from NIH and the Department of Defense for his work on developing methods of detecting and diagnosing CTE during life, as well as examining potential genetic and other risk factors for this disease. He is the lead principal investigator for the 7-year, multi-center DIAGNOSE CTE Research Project, funded by the National Institute of Neurological Disorders and Stroke. His other major areas of funded research include the assessment and treatment of Alzheimer's disease, the cognitive effects of chemotherapy in the elderly, thyroid-brain relationships, and driving and dementia. He is the BU site principal investigator for several clinical trials for the prevention and treatment of Alzheimer's disease. Dr. Stern has also published on various aspects of cognitive assessment and is the senior author of many widely used neuropsychological tests, including the Neuropsychological Assessment Battery (NAB).

Stern has received several NIH and other national grants, has published over 250 journal articles, chapters, and abstracts, and is the co-editor of two recently published books: Sports Neurology, which is part of the Handbook in Clinical Neurology series published by Elsevier, and The Oxford Handbook of Adult Cognitive Disorders, which is part of the Oxford Handbook collection. He is a Fellow of both the American Neuropsychiatric Association and the National Academy of Neuropsychology. He is a member of the Mackey-White Health and Safety Committee of the NFL Players Association, as well as the court-appointed Medical Scientific Committee for the NCAA Student-Athlete Concussion Injury Litigation. Dr. Stern has testified before the United States Senate Special Committee on Aging and the United States Senate Committee on Commerce, Science, and Transportation. He appears frequently in national and international print and broadcast media for his work on CTE and AD. He also appears in the feature-length documentaries League of Denial (PBS Frontline, 2013), Head Games (2012), and I Remember Better When I Paint (2009).

Stern received his undergraduate degree from Wesleyan University and his master's and Ph.D. degrees in clinical psychology from the University of Rhode Island. He completed his neuropsychology internship training at the Boston VA Medical Center, under the supervision of Edith Kaplan, and his postdoctoral fellowship training in both neuropsychology and psychoneuroendocrinology at the UNC School of Medicine. He was on the faculty at UNC from 1990 to 1993, where he was associate director of the NIMH-funded Mental Health Clinical Research Center and director of the Neurobehavioral Assessment Core. He then joined the faculty at Alpert Medical School, where he was associate professor of psychiatry and neurology, as well as director of neuropsychology and the Memory and Cognitive Assessment Program at Rhode Island Hospital. He also directed the Brown Clinical Neuropsychology Internship Training Program. In 2004, Stern joined the Boston University School of Medicine's Department of Neurology as an associate professor. He was promoted to professor of neurology and neurosurgery in 2011 and was then appointed to professor of neurology, neurosurgery, and neurobiology, in 2014.
