= David Stern (disambiguation) =

David Stern (1942–2020) was commissioner of the National Basketball Association.

David Stern may also refer to:

- David Stern (American businessman) (1820–1875), German-born American businessman
- J. David Stern (1886–1971), American newspaper publisher
- David Stern III (1909–2003), American newspaper manager who created Francis the Talking Mule
- David Stern (Israeli politician) (1910–2003), Israeli politician
- David H. Stern (born 1935), American-born Messianic Jewish theologian in Israel
- David D. Stern (born 1956), German-born artist in New York
- David E. Stern (born 1961), senior rabbi at Temple Emanu-El in Dallas, Texas
- David Stern (conductor) (born 1963), American conductor
- David Stern (German businessman) (born 1978)
- David Stern (academic), American scholar of Hebrew literature
- David Stern (activist), CEO of Equal Justice Works
- David G. Stern, professor of philosophy (born 1958)
- David M. Stern, writer for The Wonder Years and The Simpsons and brother of actor Daniel Stern

== See also ==
- David de Stern (1807–1877), British banker
- David Stearns (born 1985), American baseball executive
- David Sterne (born 1946), British actor
