= Robert Stern =

Robert Stern may refer to:

- Robert Stern (philosopher) (1962–2024), British professor of philosophy
- Robert A. Stern (neuropsychologist) (born 1958), American neuropsychologist
- Robert A. M. Stern (1939–2025), American architect and author
- Robert J. Stern (born 1951), American geoscientist
