= Balatonfőkajár =

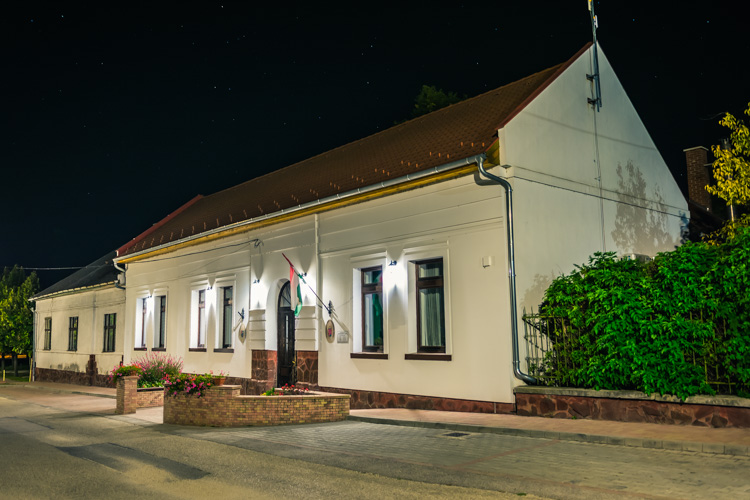
- Village hall

- Location of Veszprém county in Hungary

- Location of Balatonfőkajár
- Coordinates: 47.02050°N 18.21079°E
- Country: Hungary
- County: Veszprém

Area
  - Total: 21.92 km^{2} (8.46 sq mi)

Population (2004)
  - Total: 1,442
  - Density: 65.78/km^{2} (170.4/sq mi)
- Time zone: UTC+1 (CET)
  - Summer (DST): UTC+2 (CEST)
- Postal code: 8164
- Area code: 88
- Motorways: M7
- Distance from Budapest: 90.8 km (56.4 mi) Northeast

Balatonfőkajár (Hungarian pronunciation: [ˈbɒlɒtoɱføːkɒjaːr]) is a village in Veszprém county, Hungary, situated on the eastern end of Lake Balaton. It is home to the Balaton Park Circuit, a motorsports venue opened in 2023.

== People ==
- Stern family, ancestor of Georg Solti
