= Justice Stern =

Justice Stern may refer to:

- Horace Stern (1878–1969), associate justice and chief justice of the Supreme Court of Pennsylvania
- Leonard J. Stern (1904–1988), associate justice of the Ohio Supreme Court
