= Wolfgang Steinitz =

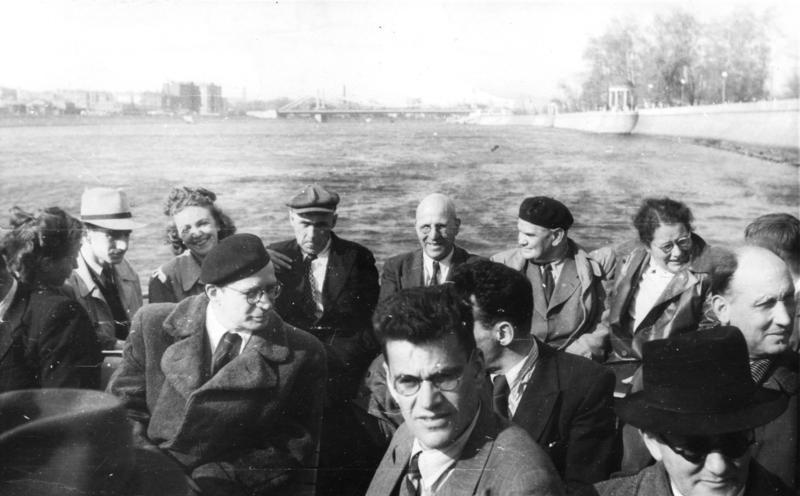
- May 1949 German delegation on a boat tour in Moscow - Steinitz in front center.
- Born: 28 February 1905; Breslau, Germany (now Poland)
- Died: 21 April 1967 (aged 62); Berlin, Germany
- Occupations: Ethnologist, linguist
- Known for: Der große Steinitz – Deutsche Volkslieder demokratischen Charakters aus sechs Jahrhunderten

Wolfgang Steinitz (28 February 1905 – 21 April 1967) was a German linguist and folklorist. Through his rediscovery of hidden social commentary in traditional folk songs, he was an important pioneer of the German folk-revival in both East and West Germany. He researched the language and culture of the Ugric peoples of West Siberia, including the songs that form an important part of the tradition of this endangered ethnic group. Steinitz also left extensive work in other areas of linguistic studies.

== Biography ==
Steinitz was born on 28 February 1905 in Breslau, the son of a wealthy Jewish lawyer. From 1923 to 1928 he studied Finno-Ugric linguistics and ethnology at the universities of Breslau and Berlin. He joined the Communist Party in 1927 and traveled to Finland, Estonia, and the Soviet Union. In 1933 Steinitz was fired from the Friedrich Wilhelm University in Berlin because he was a member of the communist party. He took his family to the Soviet Union in 1934, and taught for several years in Leningrad at the Institute of Northern Peoples, a training center for members of the indigenous peoples of the Russian North and Siberia. He fell out with his colleagues over the way the state treated ethnic minorities, leading to problems with the authorities. He left Russia and from 1938 until the end of World War II he and his family lived in Stockholm, Sweden. From 1943 he was an assistant at the Stockholm University.

Steinitz returned to Berlin in 1946, and became professor of Finno-Ugrian languages at Humboldt University. Steinitz held many different scientific and political positions in East Germany, including heading the Finno-Ugric Institute of East Berlin's Humboldt University. He may have arranged the 1951 visit to the institute by the distinguished Russian ethnographer Sergei Aleksandrovich Tokarev. For a while he was one of the most prominent political scientists in the GDR. From 1954 to 1958 he was a member of the Central Committee of the Socialist Unity Party, and from 1954 to 1963 Vice President of the GDR's German Academy of Sciences. Steinitz died in Berlin, East Germany in 1967 from the effects of a stroke.

== Work ==
=== Finno-Ugric people ===
Steinitz investigated the peoples speaking Finno-Ugric languages during his time in Leningrad, particularly the languages and cultures of the Ugric Khanty people. During his research, he stayed in a Khanty settlement on the middle Ob River for six months, and he also interviewed Khanty people who were studying in the Herzen University. After he had left the Soviet Union in 1938, he published his seminal research work in Tartu, Estonia in 1939 with the title Ostjakologische Arbeiten.

=== Music Research ===
Another focus of Steinitz's work was the collection of German folk songs that were directed against war, oppression, and misery, from the songs of the Silesian weavers to soldier songs of the Thirty Years' War, peasant complaints, songs about desertion or about contemporary events such as the revolution of 1848. He soon came in contact with little-known folk song traditions on the theme of the misery of the Silesian weavers. Steinitz's German folk songs of a Democratic Character from Six Centuries appeared in 1954 and 1962 in East Berlin. The full collection of 180 songs was published after Steinitz's sudden death in 1967.

The rediscovered "democratic people's songs" were the most influential works of the German folk revival of the 1970s. Artists like Peter Rohland, Hein & Oss Kröher, Liederjan, Zupfgeigenhansel, Hannes Wader and many others made use of Steinitz's collection, as the work revealed afresh that "folk" songs traditionally are against war, oppression, and terror. In East Germany, Steinitz's work was an important source for the folk movement. In particular, anti-military songs like "King of Prussia, great potentate / we are so tired of your rule" were in conflict with the ruling party line.

=== Other work ===
Steinitz wrote an easy-to-use textbook of the Russian language and was the founder and co-editor of a dictionary of the German language, "Wörterbuch der deutschen Sprache", which is totally available online in Open Access. Steinitz founded the Marx-Engels-dictionary in 1952, which was published in 1963 as a sample issue.

He was also the editor of the book series Neue russische Bibliothek (New Russian Library), which was published since 1946.

== Bibliography ==
- Wolfgang Steinitz: German Folk Songs democratic character of six centuries . Volume 1, Oxford University Press, Berlin 1954
- Wolfgang Steinitz: German Folk Songs democratic character of six centuries . Volume 2, Akademie-Verlag, Berlin 1962
- Wolfgang Steinitz - German folk songs democratic character of six centuries . Reprint in one volume, Zweitausendeins, Frankfurt 1983, ISBN 3-88436-101-5 .
- Wolfgang Steinitz: Ostjakologische work. Contributions to linguistics and ethnography . Edited by Gert Sauer and Renate Steinitz. Volume I - IV, Akademiai Kiado and Oxford University Press, Budapest and Berlin 1980
- Wolfgang Steinitz: Russian textbook. 10th durchges. Ed people and knowledge, Berlin 1961st
