= Oxford Handbook of Clinical Medicine =

Textbook first published in 1985

- First edition
- Author: R. A. Hope, J. M. Longmore (1e); I. B. Wilkinson, T. Raine et al. (11e)
- Language: English
- Subject: Medicine
- Genre: Reference
- Published: 1985 (1st edition); 2024 (11th edition); Oxford University Press
- Media type: Online & Hardbound
- ISBN: 9780199689903 (11th ed. 9780198844013)

The Oxford Handbook of Clinical Medicine is a pocket textbook aimed at medical students and junior doctors, and covers all aspects of clinical medicine. It is published by Oxford University Press, and is available in formats: book, online, iOS app, and android app. First published in 1985, it is now in its eleventh edition, which was released in April 2024.

== Description ==
The Oxford Handbook of Clinical Medicine, now in its 11th edition (April 2024), is a pocket textbook. It was first written by a group of friends as a collection of notes designed to help new doctors and covers the full breadth of the medical and surgery subjects. Popularly known in the UK as the "Cheese and Onion" owing to the colour scheme of the cover. It gives advice on clinical management issues, and includes "witty, esoteric asides" linking medicine to other areas, such as classic history and popular culture. The OHCM, as it's also called, was banned from various UK medical schools for making medicine “too easy”, but by 2003 had made it onto several reading lists, including Royal Free London, with the comment “everybody owns this!!”

== Editorial Team ==
The current edition of the Oxford Handbook of Clinical Medicine is edited by:

- Ian B. Wilkinson, Professor of Therapeutics, University of Cambridge, and Honorary Consultant Physician, Cambridge University Hospitals NHS Foundation Trust, UK
- Tim Raine, Clinical Fellow and Honorary Registrar, Gastroenterology and General Medicine, Wellcome Trust and Addenbrooke's Hospital, Cambridge, UK
- Kate Wiles, NIHR Doctoral Research Fellow in Nephrology and Obstetric Medicine, Guy's and St. Thomas' NHS Foundation Trust, London, UK
- Peter Hateley, GP Trainee, Devon, UK
- Dearbhla Kelly, Critical Care Medicine Fellow, John Radcliffe Hospital and Postdoctoral Brain Fellow at the Wolfson Centre for the Prevention of Stroke and Dementia, University of Oxford, UK
- Iain McGurgan, Neurology Resident, Lausanne University Hospital, Switzerland

== Contents ==
1. Thinking about medicine
2. History and examination
3. Cardiovascular medicine
4. Chest medicine
5. Endocrinology
6. Gastroenterology
7. Kidney medicine
8. Haematology
9. Infectious diseases
10. Neurology
11. Oncology and palliative care
12. Rheumatology
13. Surgery
14. Clinical chemistry
15. Eponymous syndromes
16. Radiology
17. Reference intervals, etc.
18. Practical procedures
19. Emergencies
20. References
