= Flaying of Marsyas (Bronzino) =

Painting by Bronzino

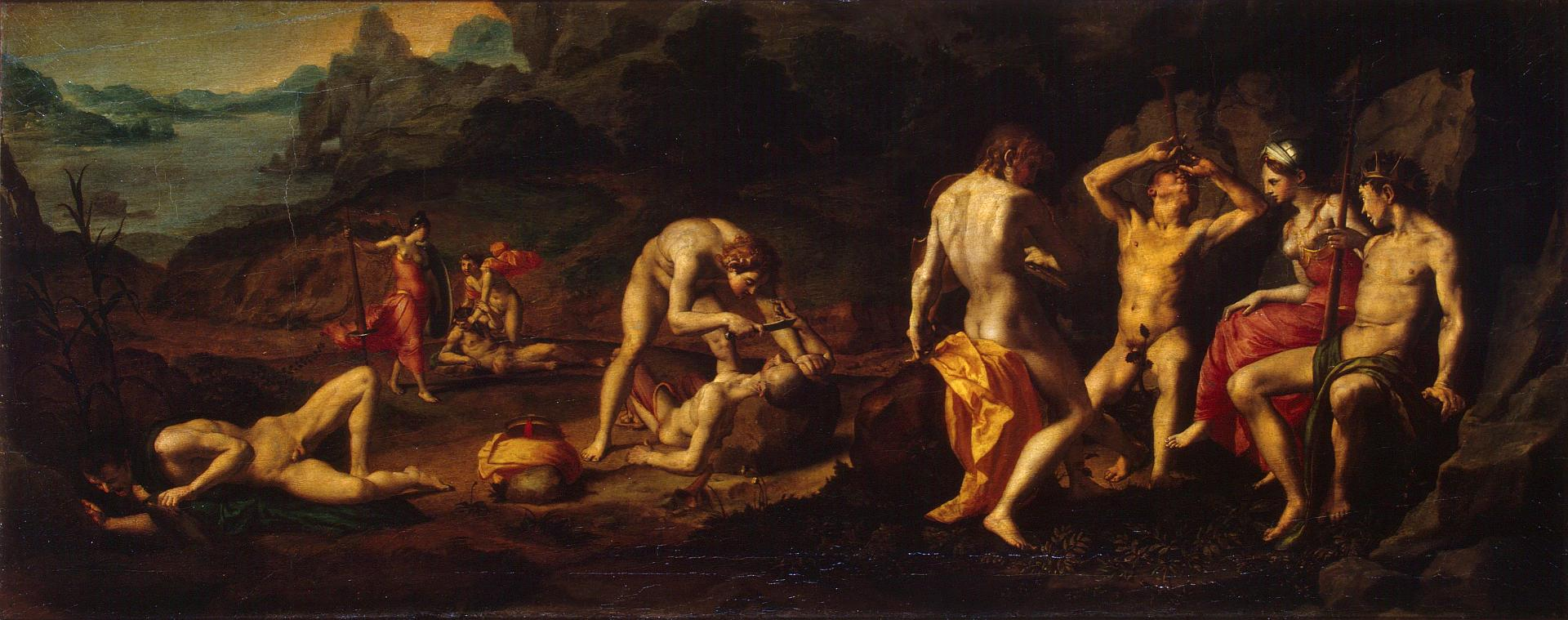
- Artist: Bronzino
- Year: c. 1531
- Dimensions: 48 cm (19 in) × 119 cm (47 in)
- Location: Hermitage Museum
- Accession no.: ГЭ-250

Flaying of Marsyas is a 1531 painting by the Florentine artist Agnolo Bronzino (Agnolo di Cosimo di Mariano, 1503-1572). The painting is held in the Hermitage Museum in Saint Petersburg, Russia. It was acquired from the collection of Antonio Litta in Milan, Italy and entered the Hermitage in 1865.

It depicts the flaying (skinning alive) of Marsyas by Apollo after the satyr rashly challenged the Greek god to a musical contest.
