= Klein-Pöchlarn =

- Municipality
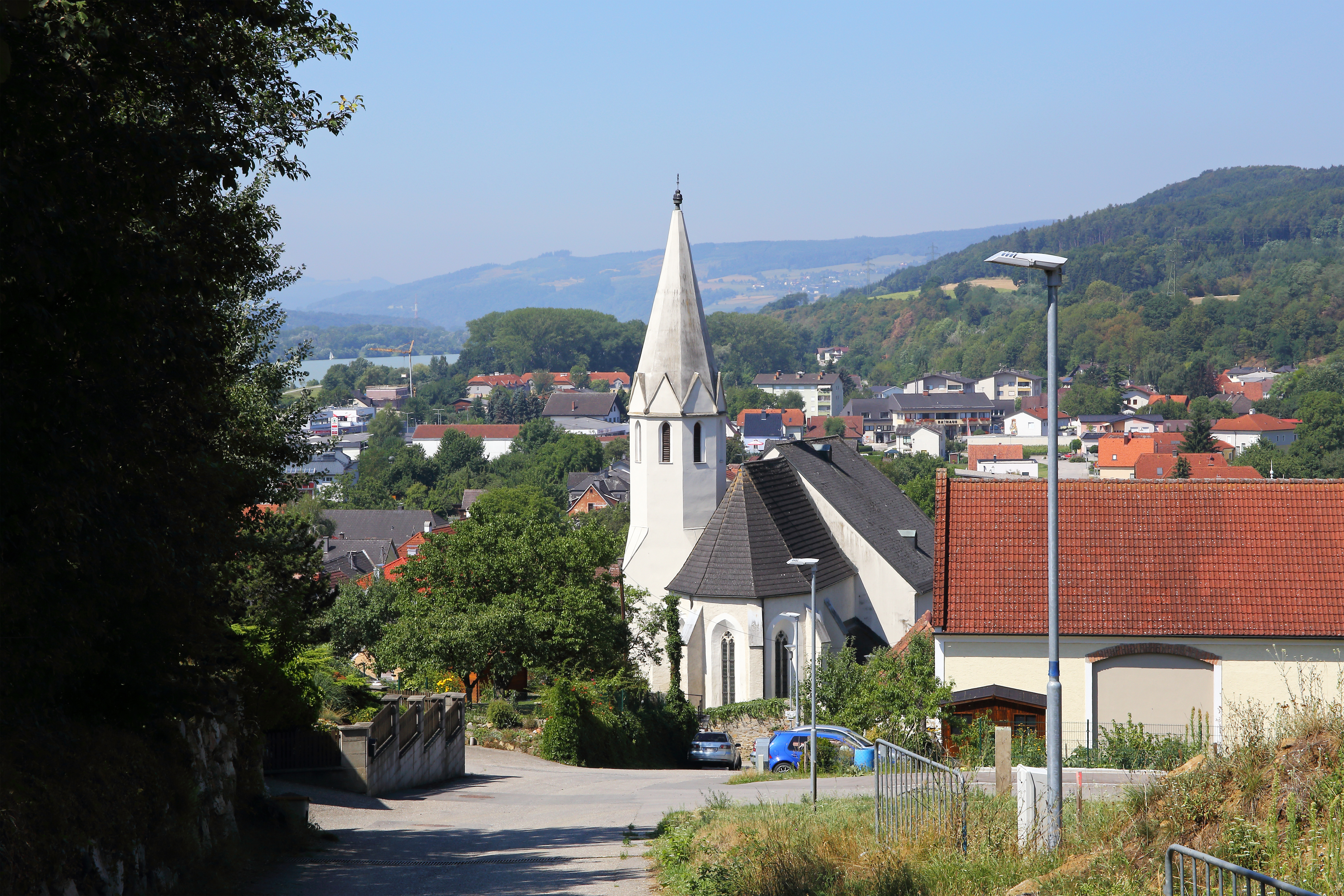
- Church of Saint Othmar

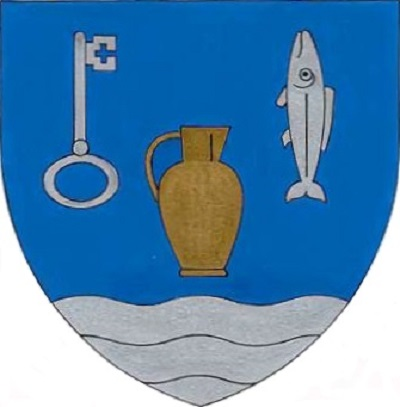
- Coat of arms

- Location within Austria
- Coordinates: 48°13′N 15°13′E
- Country: Austria
- State: Lower Austria
- District: Melk

Government
  - Mayor: Johannes Weiß (SPÖ)

Area
  - Total: 6.9 km^{2} (2.7 sq mi)
- Elevation: 223 m (732 ft)

Population (2018-01-01)
  - Total: 991
  - Density: 140/km^{2} (370/sq mi)
- Time zone: UTC+1 (CET)
  - Summer (DST): UTC+2 (CEST)
- Postal code: 3660
- Area code: 07413
- Website: www.kleinpoechlarn.at

Klein-Pöchlarn is a town in the district of Melk in the Austrian state of Lower Austria.

== Geography ==
The town is located on the left of the Danube. For reaching the other side of the river, there is a modern bridge between Pöchlarn and Klein-Pöchlarn.

== Population ==
Historical population
Year	Pop.	±%
1971	762	—
1981	856	+12.3%
1991	915	+6.9%
2001	1,002	+9.5%
