= Sam Stern =

British celebrity chef and author (born 1990)

- Born: 29 August 1990 (age 35)
- Occupations: Chef and author

Sam Stern (born 29 August 1990) is a British celebrity chef and author. He has written six cookbooks Cooking Up A Storm – The Teen Survival Cookbook – translated into 14 languages – Real Food Real Fast; Get Cooking; Sam Stern's Student Cookbook; Eat Vegetarian all published by Walker Books, UK. And Virgin to Veteran – How to Get Cooking with Confidence – published by Quadrille.

Stern grew up as the youngest of five siblings in Yorkshire, England. Stern writes a regular blog, with cooking advice and recipes. He has written for First News, a children's newspaper. He wrote a monthly feature for 'Yorkshire Life Magazine' and has contributed to multiple of newspapers and magazines internationally. Furthermore, he has appeared on radio and television in the US, where he toured for three weeks.
