= Henry Stern =

Henry Stern may refer to:

- Henry Aaron Stern (1820–1885), Anglican missionary
- Henry Stern (New York politician) (1935–2019), commissioner of the New York City Department of Parks and Recreation
- Henry Stern (California politician) (born 1982), California state senator
- Henry Stern, finalist in a Magic: The Gathering World Championship
- Henry Stern, screenwriter of Paper Dolls

== See also ==
- Harry Stern, mayor of Cumberland, Maryland
- Henry Sterns, American bobsledder
