= David G. Stern =

American philosophy professor

David G. Stern (born 1958) is an American philosopher. He is a professor of philosophy at the University of Iowa.

== Life and works ==
=== Selected publications ===
==== Monographs ====
- Stern, David G. (2004). Wittgenstein's Philosophical Investigations: An Introduction. Cambridge Introductions to Key Philosophical Texts. Cambridge: Cambridge University Press. doi:10.1017/cbo9781139167185. ISBN 978-0-521-81442-3.
- Stern, David G. (1995-03-23). Wittgenstein on Mind and Language. Oxford University PressNew York. doi:10.1093/0195080009.001.0001. ISBN 0-19-508000-9.

==== Editorials ====
- Stern, David G., ed. (2016). Wittgenstein: Lectures, Cambridge 1930–1933: From the Notes of G. E. Moore. Cambridge: Cambridge University Press. doi:10.1017/cbo9781139644600. ISBN 978-1-107-04116-5.
