= Flaying of Marsyas (Titian) =

Painting by Titian

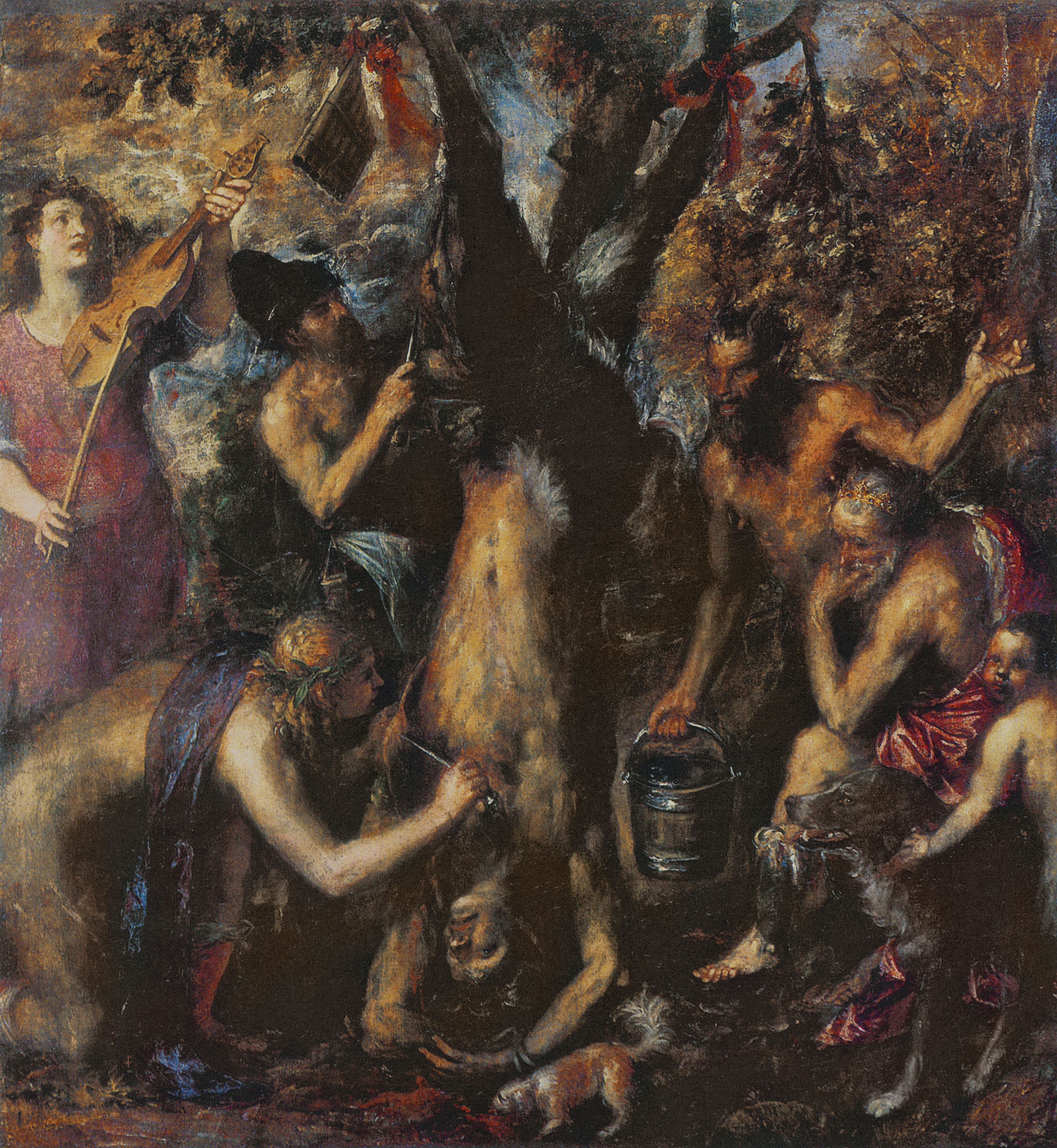
- Artist: Titian
- Year: c. 1570–1576
- Medium: Oil on canvas
- Dimensions: 212 cm × 207 cm (83 in × 81 in)
- Location: Archbishop's Palace in Kroměříž, Czech Republic; Kroměříž

The Flaying of Marsyas is a painting by the Italian late Renaissance artist Titian, probably painted between about 1570 and his death in 1576, when in his eighties. It is now in the Archbishop's Palace in Kroměříž, Czech Republic and belongs to the Archbishopric of Olomouc (administered by Olomouc Museum of Art – Archdiocesan Museum). It is one of Titian's last works, and may be unfinished, although there is a partial signature on the stone in the foreground.

The painting shows the killing by flaying or skinning alive of Marsyas, a satyr who rashly challenged the god Apollo to a musical contest. It is one of several canvases with mythological subjects from Ovid which Titian executed in his late years, mostly the poesie series for King Philip II of Spain, of which this painting seems not to have been part.

The painting has been in Kroměříž in Moravia since 1673, and was rather forgotten about, being off the beaten track as far as Venetian painting is concerned. It "did not enter critical literature until 1909". By the 1930s it was "widely accepted as an important late work" among scholars, but little known by a wider public.

On its first modern appearance abroad, it "was greeted with astonished admiration" as the "star attraction" of a major exhibition at the Royal Academy in London in 1983, It was new to most viewers and was described by John Russell in the New York Times as "the most astonishing picture in the show". Beginning an extended analysis, Sir Lawrence Gowing wrote that "All these months – it is not too much to say – London has been half under the spell of this masterpiece, in which the tragic sense that overtook Titian’s poesie in his seventies reached its cruel and solemn extreme. At most hours on most days there is a knot of visitors riveted and fairly perplexed in front of it. ... At the Academy people still ask, and on the radio well-meaning critics debate, how it is possible that a horribly painful subject should be the occasion of beauty or greatness in art."

== Description and subject ==
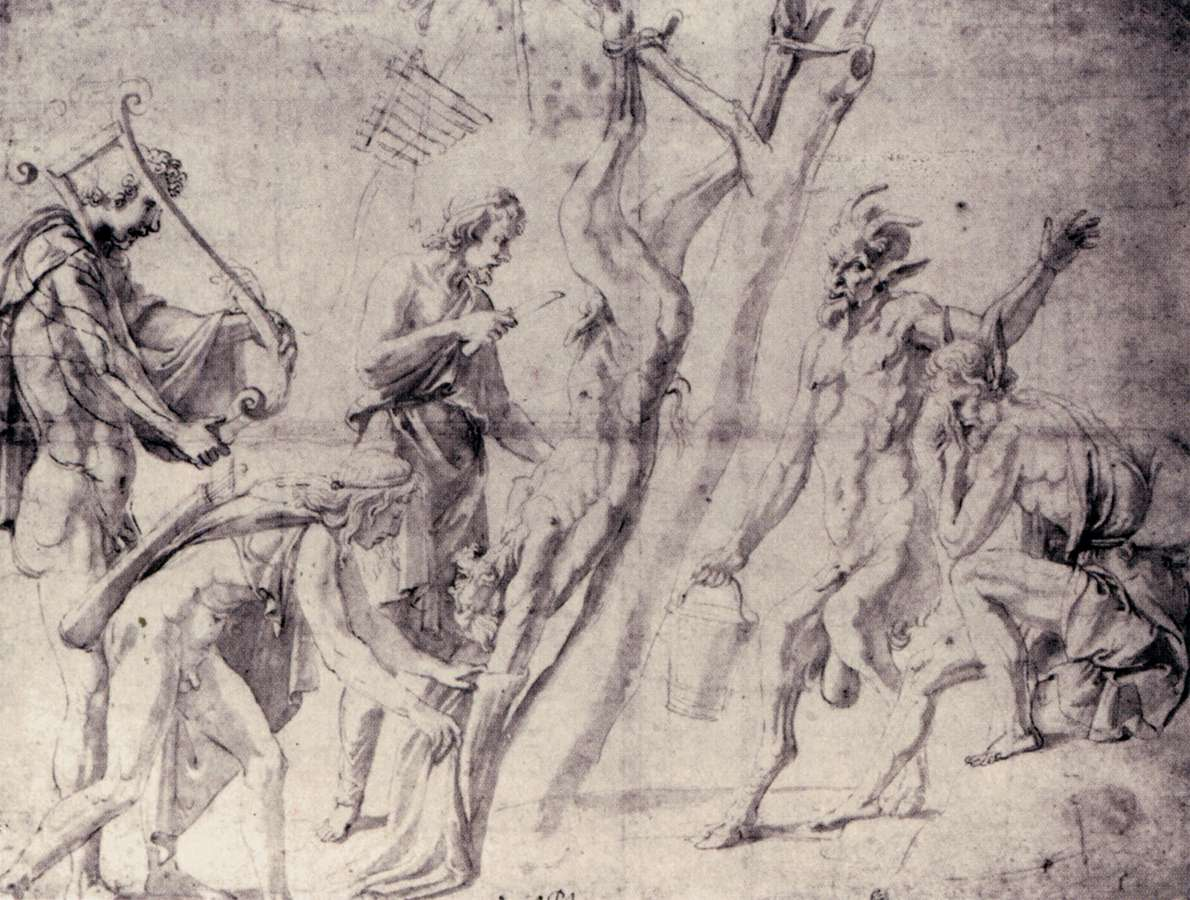
Drawing by Giulio Romano, Louvre, for a fresco in Mantua, 1524-34.

The choice of such a violent scene was perhaps inspired by the death of Marcantonio Bragadin, the Venetian commander of Famagusta in Cyprus who was flayed by the Ottomans when the city fell in August 1571, causing enormous outrage in Venice. Titian's composition is undoubtedly derived from that of Giulio Romano from several decades before (see "Visual sources" below).

Both artists follow the account in Ovid's Metamorphoses (Book 6, lines 382–400), which covers the contest very quickly, but describes the flaying scene at relative length, though with few indications that would help to visualize it. Marsyas cries out "Why do you tear me from myself?".

Marsyas was a skillful player of the classical aulos or double flute, for which by Titian's time pan pipes were usually substituted in art, and his set hangs from the tree over his head. Apollo played his usual lyre, which is here represented by a modern lira da braccio, an ancestor of the violin with up to seven strings. This is played by a figure of uncertain identity, who some scholars have said to be Apollo himself, perhaps appearing a second time, since Apollo is clearly the figure wearing a laurel wreath who is kneeling down and using his knife to flay Marsyas' chest. It has also been suggested that the musician is Orpheus, or Olympus, a devoted pupil of Marsyas, who Apollo later converts to playing the lyre, and Ovid mentions. The mythical King Midas, the seated old man on the right, is often thought to be a self-portrait. His downward line of gaze at Marsyas is parallel to that of the musician looking up to the heavens on the other side of the painting.

Ovid avoids the question of who the judges of the contest were. In most Greek accounts the Three Muses did the role, but the story early became confused with another, the "Judgement of Midas", which has happened here. This was another musical contest, always with lyre versus pan pipes, but with Pan himself on the pipes. Of course Apollo won, but in some accounts King Midas preferred Pan, and was given the ears of a donkey as punishment, while Pan was merely humiliated. The seated figure at right wears a diadem and is Midas, though his ears seem unaffected. The "Judgement of Midas" was also sometimes painted. Both stories were set in Phrygia, in modern Turkey, where Midas ruled, which in the ancient world had various associations with music. The Phrygians were not Greek, until Hellenized after Alexander the Great, but lived on the edge of the Greek world. The human with the knife wears a Phrygian cap.

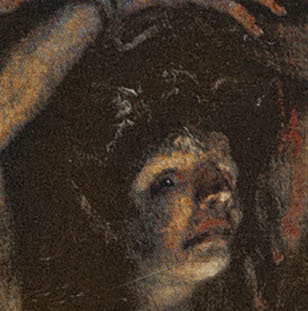
The head of Marsyas, inverted

Apollo is assisted by a sinister "Scythian" figure on the left, working on Marsyas' leg, and a satyr with a bucket behind Midas, perhaps to collect blood, or hold the removed skin, which in some versions of the story Apollo later had nailed up in a temple. A small boy, or boy satyr, restrains a large dog at right, while a much smaller dog is lapping at the blood that has fallen to the ground. As was typical in Titian's day, and especially in his works, the satyr is shown with the legs and feet of a goat, and inverting him emphasizes these, as well as giving him the position typical of mid-sized animals being slaughtered or skinned before butchering. Most of his body still seems unflayed, but Apollo holds a large flap of detached skin in the hand not holding his knife.

Compositionally, the "V" shape made by Marsyas's legs is echoed by the highlighted "V"s of the bent arms of the four figures nearest to him, all of whom are looking at him. Indeed, his navel is almost exactly at the centre of the canvas as it now is. Technical examinations have determined that two of the main differences to the Giulio Romano composition are changes made well after painting was underway; originally the musician merely held his instrument, as in the Giulio Romano composition, and the boy or small satyr and the large dog were not present. A version of the subject with these features, not by Titian or his workshop but perhaps roughly contemporary, is in a private collection in Venice. It may be based on a different version by Titian, or a study, and in these respects is closer to the Giulio Romano drawing (illustrated below).

== Meaning ==
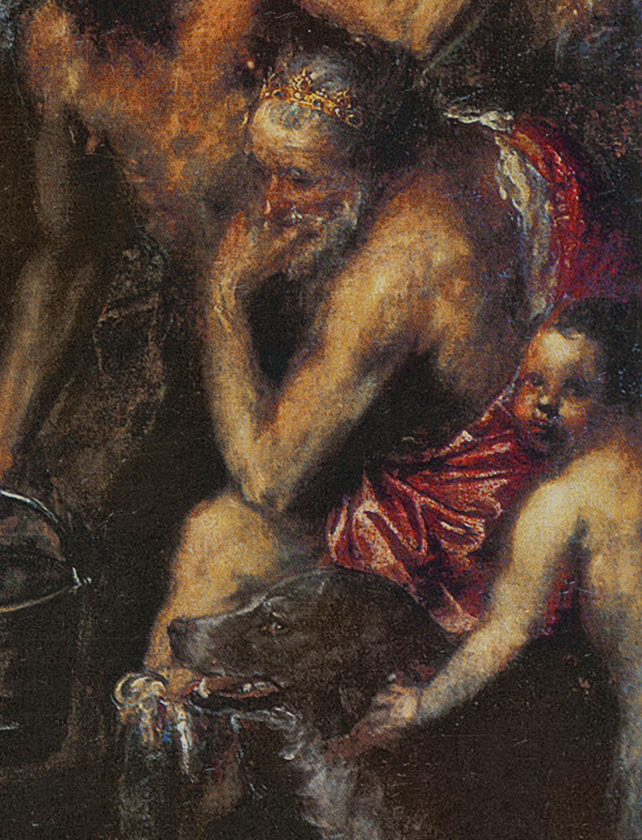
Detail with Midas

Many writers have attempted to capture the meaning of the "famously savage" painting, which, despite "the brutality of the treatment", has been found powerfully compelling by many, and described as "the most discussed, revered and loathed of all Titian's paintings". One common suggestion has been that the painting reflects ideas in Renaissance Neoplatonism about the "liberation of the spirit from the body", or the acquisition of higher insight or clarity. Such ideas are usually considered to be involved in another famous treatment of flaying: the flayed skin carrying a self-portrait face of Michelangelo, held by Saint Bartholomew as his attribute in The Last Judgment in the Sistine Chapel. One of Michelangelo's poems had used the metaphor of a snake shedding its old skin for his hope for a new life after his death.

In this spirit, Dante began his Paradiso with a prayer addressed to Apollo, who he asks to "Enter my breast, and so infuse me your spirit as you did Marsyas when you tore him from the cover of his limbs. In some other Renaissance depictions, Marsyas's furry legs appear human when flayed, so he "is redeemed from the animality that condemned him to this terrible fate".

The philosopher-turned-novelist Iris Murdoch was especially fascinated by the painting, which she described in an interview as "the greatest in the Western canon". It is mentioned in three of her novels, and sometimes discussed by the characters. In her portrait for the National Portrait Gallery by Tom Phillips, a reproduction occupies most of the wall behind her head. She said it was "something to do with human life and all its ambiguities and all its horrors and terrors and misery, and at the same time there’s something beautiful, the picture is beautiful, and something also to do with the entry of the spiritual into the human situation and the closeness of the gods ..."

The general interpretation of the story of Marsyas was as an illustration of the inevitable disaster that followed hubris in the form of a challenge to a god. An idea of the contest reinforcing the general moral and artistic superiority of the courtly lyre, or modern stringed instruments, over the rustic and frivolous wind family was present in much ancient discussion, and perhaps retained some relevance in the 16th century. Gowing comments: "It was on behalf of order and the laws of harmonious proportion, which sound in the music of strings, that Apollo claimed victory over the chaotic and impulsive sound of the pipes." For Edgar Wind the contest determined "the relative powers of Dionysian darkness and Apollonian clarity; and if the contest ended with the flaying of Marsyas, it was because flaying was itself a Dionysian rite, a tragic ordeal of purification by which the ugliness of the outward man was thrown off and the beauty of his inward self revealed". Alternatively, there have been suggestions that the painting has a political meaning, either general or specific, and depicts the "just punishment" of hubristic opponents.

The 'three ages of man' are all represented (if satyrs are allowed to count), indeed on the right they are aligned diagonally. The boy or young satyr is looking rather vacuously out at the viewer, those in their prime are concentrating on their tasks with a variety of expressions, and Midas contemplates the scene, apparently with melancholy resignation, but making no further attempt to intervene.

== History ==
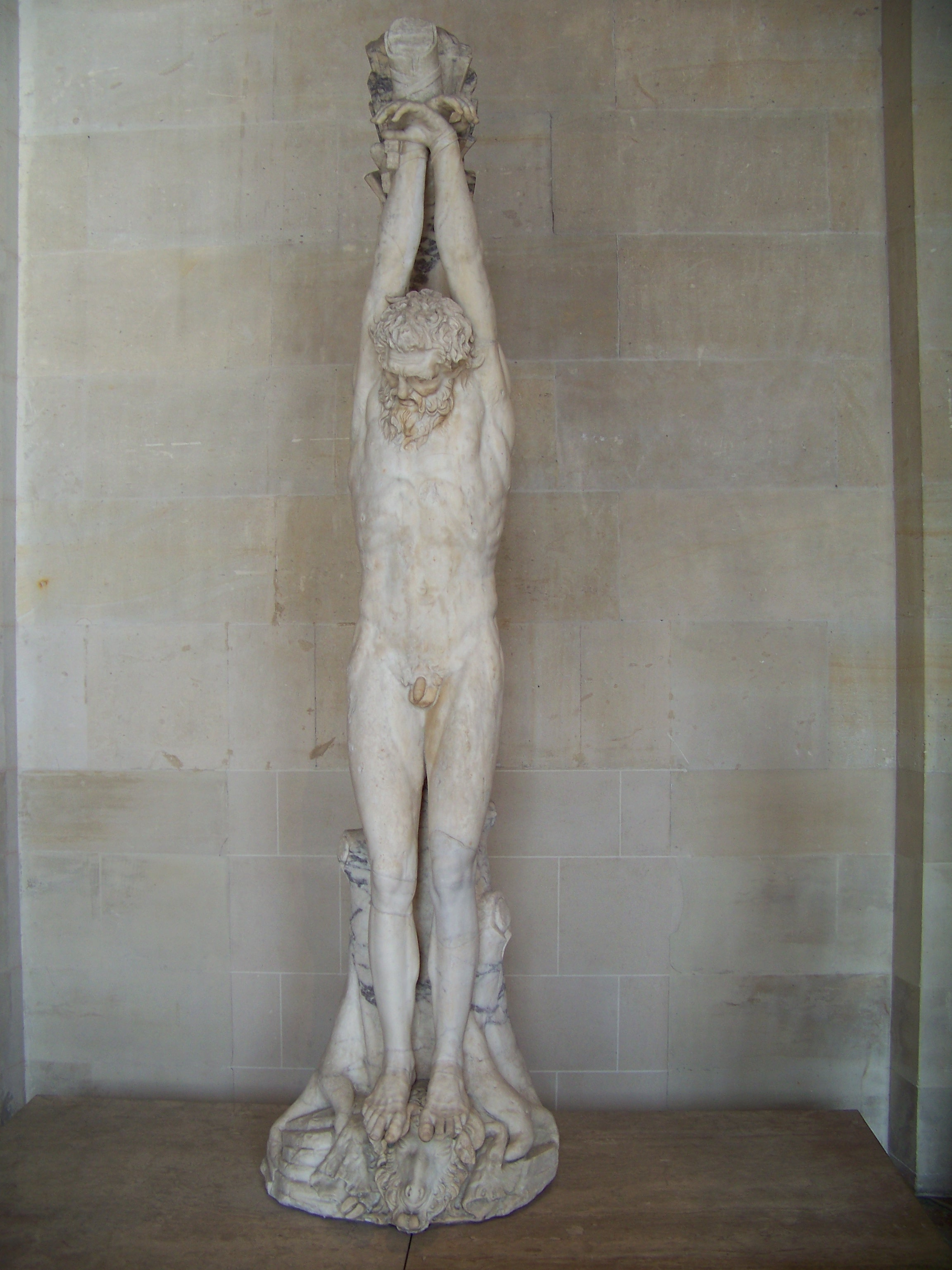
Roman version of the Hellenistic figure type, Louvre

It is unknown whether the painting had an intended recipient; Titian's main client in his last years was King Philip II of Spain, but the picture is not mentioned in the surviving correspondence. The painting may well be one of those still in Titian's studio at his death in 1576. There are a number of these, including for example The Death of Actaeon in the National Gallery, London (certainly intended for Philip), and there is a general argument as to whether they should be regarded as finished or not. In this case the signature and areas of detailed finish may suggest that the painting had been completed.

Nothing is known of its history before it appears in an inventory of 1655 of the Arundel Collection, by then in exile from the English Civil War in Amsterdam. This was formed by Thomas Howard, 21st Earl of Arundel (d. 1646) and his wife Alethea Howard, and was mostly dispersed by their son after Alethea's death in 1655. The collection had mostly been formed in the 1620s, when the Howards went on an extended visit to Italy, and it is presumed that the painting was bought there.

The painting was bought by Franz Imstenraed in 1655. He was the nephew of (Edvard, Everard or) Everhard Jabach, a banker from Cologne who was one of the greatest private collectors of the century, and also acted as an agent for Cardinal Mazarin and Louis XIV of France. In the 1650s the superb collection of Arundel's friend Charles I of England was being dispersed in London, and Jabach, acting on behalf of Louis, was one of many international buyers active, with agents on the ground.

In 1673 it was acquired by Karl II von Liechtenstein-Kastelkorn, Bishop of Olomouc, after being a prize in a lottery. He also bought most of the collection of the brothers Bernhard and Franz Imstenraed, which remains intact in Kroměříž Castle, the former Archbishop's Palace, now the National Museum, in Kroměříž.

It appears the painting was cut down at top and bottom, and added to at the sides, especially on the right, during the 18th century. In modern times, the painting has been exhibited abroad in London in 1983 and 2003, in Washington in 1986, and in Paris, Vienna, Venice, Rome, and New York, most recently in "Unfinished: Thoughts Left Visible", an exhibition of unfinished works, at Met Breuer in 2016.

== Visual sources ==
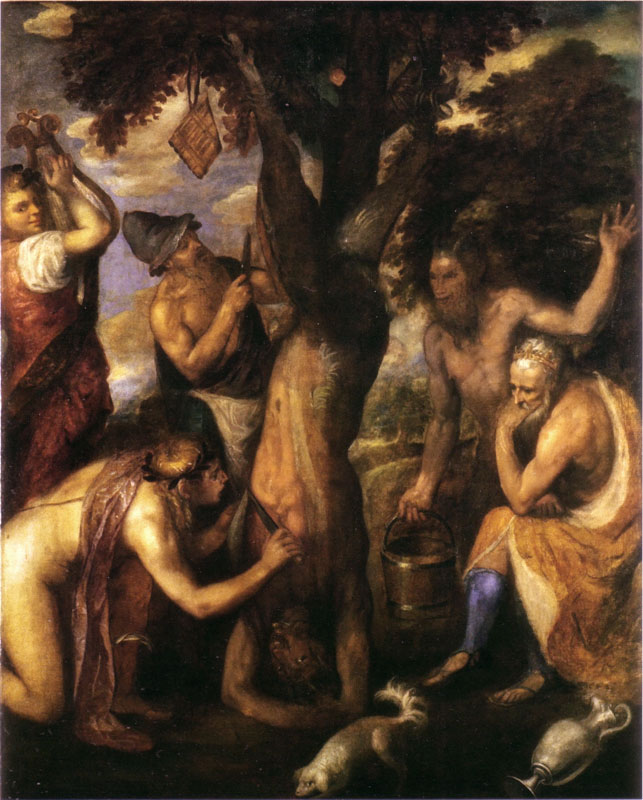
Version (not by Titian) apparently reflecting an earlier stage of the composition, closer to the Giulio Romano drawing. It lacks the boy and large dog, and the musician holds a different instrument.

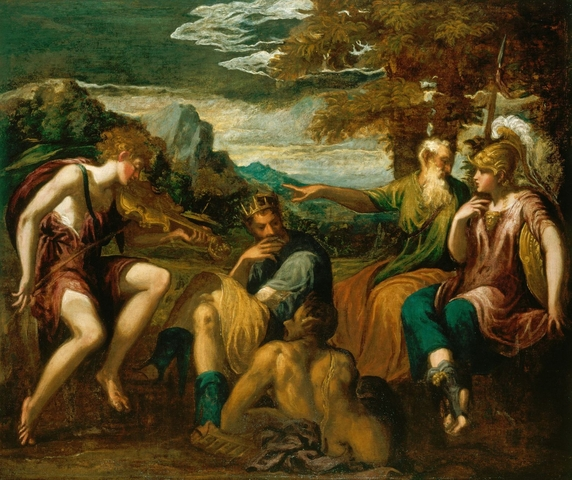
Andrea Schiavone, Judgement of Midas, Royal Collection, c 1548–50

Marsyas, as a single figure, was a well-known subject in Roman and Hellenistic sculpture, with a famous type showing him tied and hanging with his arms above his head. This probably originated in Hellenistic Pergamon, and was well-known from various examples by the late Renaissance, followed for example by Raphael in a small scene on the ceiling of the Stanza della Segnatura in the Vatican. But this is not a very direct influence on Titian's composition.

Much closer is "an awkward sketch for a now damaged fresco" by Giulio Romano in the Palazzo Te in Mantua (1524–34), for which there is also a drawing in the Louvre; this is clearly the main source for the composition. It has all the same figures and elements except the boy and the dogs, in roughly the same positions, including, apparently for the first time in art, Marsyas shown tied upside down. The standing figure at left is a servant holding a lyre, rather than Titian's lira da bracchio player. The seated figure of Midas has donkey ears, and is more clearly distressed, holding his hands over his face, and Apollo, bending down rather than on one knee, is not cutting, but is pulling the skin off like a jacket.

Andrea Schiavone's Judgement of Midas in the British Royal Collection (in 2017 displayed in the Gallery at Kensington Palace), is some twenty years earlier, from c. 1548–50, and is comparable to Titian, in atmosphere and some details of the composition. Titian "must also have remembered elements of this painting: the pensive and abstracted attitudes of Apollo and Midas, and the radically free impressionistic brushwork used to heighten the dramatic mood of the story." Apollo also plays a lira da bracchio, and Midas, as yet with normal ears, looks straight at Pan.

Midas or "Midas/Titian adopts the traditional melancholic's pose", which Titian would have known from Raphael's supposed portrait of Michelangelo as Heraclitus in The School of Athens, and Albrecht Dürer's Melencolia I, not to mention the Schiavone.

== Technique and style ==
The technique is characteristic of Titian's late style. Nicholas Penny commented that there are "intense greens and blues and reds (vermilion as well as crimson) ... after 1560 Titian began to apply these colours in scumbles, often with his fingers, so that they only half belong to any of the forms and seem to float on the surface of the painting: evidently he painted them last. ... one can still see passages of smoky preliminary painting (notably the ghostly body of Apollo) but the blood, dogs' tongues and the ribbons in the trees are brilliant red."

Describing a group of late works which he considers finished, including this, and contrasting them with the Death of Actaeon, which he considers unfinished, Penny notes "the impact of blurred areas of painting (... indecipherable distances, light piercing foliage) is enhanced by contrast with forms that were more fully modelled, if still often roughly painted, and, indeed, with some that were more detailed (Midas's diadem ...)". There are strong white highlights on the knife blades, the bucket, and elsewhere, comparable with those in Tarquin and Lucretia, which Titian delivered in 1571.

Beyond the purely technical means, many critics have tried to articulate evocations of Titian's pictorial language in this and other very late paintings. According to Sydney Freedberg, "the surfaces of bodies make a silvered incanescence and the atmosphere, almost unbreathably dense, is like dulled fire. ...There is a wry comedy within the cruelty, ugliness and strangeness within the magisterial beauty, and terror accompanies the sense of the sublime." For John Steer "it is not individual colours that tell, but an all-over emanation of broken touches, evoking a greenish-gold, that is splattered, appropriately to the theme, with reds like splotches of blood. Vision and expression are here so much one that they cannot, even for the purposes of discussion, be separated. .... Titian's intense struggle to grasp in paint, through tone and colour, the physical realities of the scene is a fundamental part of their meaning."

== In popular culture ==
In Thomas Harris' 1988 novel, The Silence of the Lambs, the character of Hannibal Lecter mentions the painting in a discussion of the topic of flaying as method of human execution.

== See also ==
- List of works by Titian
