= Leo Stern (historian) =

Austrian-German political activist and historian

- Born: Jonas Leib Stern; 26 March 1901; Voloka, Czernowitz, Bukovina, Austro-Hungarian empire
- Died: 2 January 1982 (aged 80); Halle, German Democratic Republic
- Education: Vienna; Moscow
- Occupations: Political activist Political journalist University Professor; Soldier; Historian; University rector
- Political party: SPÖ; KPÖ; SED
- Spouse: Alice Melber-Stern (1921–2007)
- Children: Manfred Stern (1946–2018); Sylvia Stern (born 1949)
- Parents: Zalman Stern (1861–1901/2) (father); Henriette "Yetty" Korn (1863–1934) (mother)

Jonas Leib "Leo" Stern (26 March 1901 – 2 January 1982) was an Austrian-German left-wing political activist. In 1933 he switched his party membership from the Social Democratic Party to the Communist Party. During the fascist ascendancy he participated in the Spanish Civil War as an anti-Franco Interbrigadist and later, in the Great Patriotic War, served as an officer in the Soviet Red Army. Between the two he studied successfully for a higher degree at the University of Moscow, receiving his Habilitation degree in 1940 in return for a dissertation on Contemporary Catholicism.

Emerging from the war in 1945 committed to Soviet-style communism, he made his home in occupied Vienna where he taught at the university. In 1950 he relocated to the newly launched Soviet sponsored German Democratic Republic (East Germany), taking East German citizenship in 1952. He made his home at Halle, accepting a teaching position at the university and quickly becoming one of the best known Marxist historians in the country. Between 1953 and 1959 he served as University Rector (Chief Officer and Administrator) at the merged (since 1817) Martin Luther University of Halle-Wittenberg.

== Life and works ==
=== Provenance and early years ===
Jonas Leib Stern was born into a large Jewish family at Voloka, a village near Czernowitz (as Chernivtsi was then known). Today (since 1991) the region is part of Ukraine, but at the time of Leib's birth it was part of the Austro-Hungarian empire: between (approximately) 1920 and the Second World War it was part of Romania. His father, Zalman Stern (1861–1901/2), is described as a farmer-businessman. Jonas was the youngest of his parents' twelve recorded children born between 1888 and 1901. His three elder brothers included the communist activists Manfred Stern (1896–1954), believed to have worked for Soviet intelligence in China the United States, and Wolfgang "Wolf" Stern (1897–1961), a military historian. (The fourth of the brothers, Dr. Filipp Stern, left less of a footprint in the historical record of twentieth century political activism.)

1901 (applying the Gregorian calendar) was the year both of the Leo Stern's birth and of his father's death. The region in which he was born and grew up was an impoverished one. Jonas Leib grew up with his mother, born Henriette "Yetty" Korn (1863–1934) and siblings, in circumstances of some poverty. At the age of ten he was already working in order to pay for his own schooling, doing odd jobs and tutoring. His school costs were also subsidised by means of a small bursary. Despite the financial pressures he attended both elementary and secondary schools at Czernowitz, passing his Matura (school graduation exam) in 1921. By that time he had already, in 1918, joined the Young Socialists.

=== Vienna ===
On leaving school he moved to Vienna, registering his residency in the Austrian capital on 14 October 1921. It was normal across the Austrian empire for citizens to register their place of residence with the local town hall: he registered under the name "Jonas Leib" and entered his citizenship as Romanian, reflecting recent frontier changes. More intriguingly, when registering his residency he gave his religion as Muslim and his mother tongue as German There is also a reference in at least one source to his having worked as a middle-school teacher on conclusion of his school career, which probably reflected the need to "work his way" through his university-level education. Directly after registering his residency he enrolled for what turned out to be a four-year lower and higher degree course at the University Faculty of Laws and Political Sciences, in time for the winter term of 1921/22. He studied Jurisprudence, Applied Economics (Nationalökonomie) and History. It was also in 1921 that Leo Stern became a member of the Social Democratic Party (SPÖ).

According to Stern's own later recollection, the three professors at the University of Vienna who most influenced his thinking and future course were the philosopher-historian Carl Grünberg (1861–1940), the jurist-politician Max Adler (1873–1937) and the noted legal scholar Hans Kelsen (1881–1973). From a Marxist perspective, the politics of the university were overwhelmingly "Bourgeois" and conservative. Grünberg, Adler and Kelsen stood out as professors around whom the relatively few left-wing students tended to gravitate.

Having obtained his residency permit in 1921, on 23 September 1923 he took citizenship from the city authorities, and then on 2 October 1923 took the vow that made him a citizen of Austria. At this point he gave his residence as Porzellangasse 53, in the "Vienna 9" (Alsergrund) quarter, a five-minute walk from the university main building.

In 1925 Stern earned his doctorate ("Doctor rerum politicarum") with a dissertation on the modalities of Mercantilism. (Note: "Die sozialökonomischen und politischen Grundlagen des Merkantilismus") This work was supervised by Carl Grünberg. He now stayed on at the university, working as a personal research assistant for Max Adler till 1932. He combined this with a teaching job at the Adult Education Centre in Vienna between 1927 and 1934. There are various references to his having engaged during this period as an education advisor to the "Free Trades Unions" organisation. In addition, between 1926 and 1934, Stern headed up the "Marxism Study Group" (Marxistische Studiengemeinschaft) at the university department of Socio-economics. He taught a number of one and two years courses on various related topics, falling under the broad subject areas of "Sociology" and "Applied Economics". Much of the same teaching material also turned up in his contributions on political-history to left-wing political journals and magazines, such as "Der Kampf", "Arbeit und Wirtschaft", "Die Weltbühne" and "Internationale Rundschau". They were published not under a name by which he was commonly known, but using one of three pseudonyms: F. Schneider, L. Taylor and L. Hofmeister. He also found time to continue with his own academic studies, obtaining his Absolutorium in 1927 or 1928, and then pursuing his researches "on the state theory of Marxism" in preparation for a dissertation intended to lead to a habilitation degree.

Stern was also engaged in terms of more direct political involvement. As in much of the rest of Europe, so in Austria, the later 1920s were a period of intensifying political polarisation both among the politicians in Vienna and on the streets, and the tensions were only exacerbated by the economic austerity that arrived as part of the powerful backwash of the Wall Street crash. In 1927 Stern was still a member of the Social Democratic Party, although he was regarded by many, including himself, as part of the party's extreme left-wing. He participated in the 1927 "July revolt", teaming up with his comrade Ernst Fischer with whom he worked closely. Later, probably during the early or middle 1930s, there would be a spectacular falling out between the two men. Although for many years, out of respect for party discipline, Stern set aside or concealed his dislike of his former partner in activist politics, it is clear from a letter that he wrote in 1968 to Eduard Rabofsky (1911–1994), that under the surface, Stern's mistrust and loathing of Fischer persisted.

At the government level, during 1933 events in Austria broadly tracked those in Germany. In March 1933 all three speakers of the National Council (the principal power-house of the Austrian parliament) resigned and Chancellor Dollfuss determined that parliament had eliminated itself. Opposition parties proved ineffectual in their attempts to re-establish parliamentary governance, and government by decree became the default mechanism for controlling the country. A rapid slide towards post-democratic "Austro-Fascism" followed. Among Social Democratic Party activists there was intense frustration at the seeming unwillingness or inability of the party leadership to prevent this political catastrophe; and there was a growing view, especially on the left of the party, that when it came to preparations for defending workers' rights in a fascist state, the Communist Party was organising itself more effectively than the SPÖ. Throughout much of 1933 Stern seems to have been in touch with Communist Party activists in Vienna, and in October of that year he made the switch, quitting the SPÖ and joining the KPÖ. A number of workers, students and intellectuals in his immediate circle followed his example. The move came shortly after an ideological and political break between Stern and his old mentor, Max Adler. Stern would remain an influential member of the Austrian Communist Party till 1950, though for most of that time he would be exiled, like many Austrian Communist leaders and other politically engaged comrades, in Moscow.

In 1934 it was, accordingly, as a Communist that Leo Stern took part, in Vienna, in the brief but intensely brutal February uprising. Sources are largely silent as to the nature of his contribution. He was arrested and taken into police detention on 18 February 1934. At some stage during the next five months he was moved to a section of the vast former munitions factory at Wöllersdorf (a short distance to the south of Vienna) that had been converted the previous year into a detention camp. After his release, which took place on 15 July 1934, Stern returned to his "party work", which by this point had become unambiguously illegal. He worked in the party "Agitation Department", based in the study-library of the Vienna Chamber of Labour (AK), supported by the pioneer of "Popular Education" (Volksbildung), Viktor Matejka (1901–1993). Meanwhile the party sustained an "underground" organisation structure into which Stern was drawn, becoming at some stage Head of the Propaganda Department of the Party Central Committee. There was always an element of uncertainty as to how much or how little the authorities knew about Leo Stern's secret party work, but in the early Autumn/Fall of 1935, believing him to be in danger of imminent police arrest, the party leaders, who were by this time themselves based in Czechoslovakia, ordered Leo Stern to join them in Prague. This he did in October 1935.

=== Prague ===
Stern remained in Prague for slightly more than half a year, during which he authored a work on "the left-wing opposition from within the Social Democratic Party of Austria" (Note: "Die Geschichte der Linksopposition in der SPÖ") In May 1936, again in compliance with party instructions, he emigrated again, this time to the Soviet Union. Although Russia would be his home base for almost ten years, his initial stay there would be relatively brief.

=== Moscow ===
In Moscow he was accommodated in the famous Hotel Lux, a large luxury hotel opened in 1911 as the "Hotel Franzija" (Гостиница Франция), and subsequently further enlarged. By the time of Stern's arrival it had become home to large numbers of political exiles and (in some cases) their families. Most had fled from Germany in the aftermath of 1933. Other nationalities were already well represented among the "guests", however, including Austrians, and the hotel was by this time being used as an informal headquarters location for exiled communist parties from various countries in central and western Europe. Leo Stern as well as two of his three brothers, Manfred and Wolf Stern, all lived at the Hotel Lux during the later 1930s. During this time he was employed as a tutor-lecturer at the International Lenin School. He combined this with work in the press department of the Comintern; and he contributed as an "editor" in respect of new German language versions of "classic works" of "Marxism-Leninism-Stalinism".

=== Spanish Civil War ===
Following a basic military training he volunteered or was seconded for military service with the anti-Franco International Brigades, set up a year earlier by the Communist International to assist the Popular Front government of the Second Spanish Republic. Stern served in Spain with the Soviet brigades between January 1937 and April 1938. Few details are available of Stern's contributions during the Spanish Civil War: according to at least one source Manfred Stern, Wolfgang Stern and Leo Stern (identified in Comintern communications of the time under the code name "Fred") all participated as military intelligence officers.

=== Back to Moscow ===
The dictator's paranoia was at its peak when Leo Stern was recalled to Moscow, early in 1938: he had good reason to be apprehensive. Many comrades who had escaped from political or race driven persecution in Germany and Austria earlier in the decade were being summarily arrested by the authorities and shot or deported to concentration camps far away from Moscow. Leo's elder brother Manfred returned to Moscow at around the same time, only to be arrested and, in May 1939, condemned to fifteen years of hard labour: in February 1954 Manfred Stern died in a Soviet labour camp three months short of the fifteenth anniversary of his conviction. Fate, or Stalin's security services, dealt less brutally with Leo Stern, however. He was employed, till the end of 1939, by the "Publisher for International Literature" as an "Editor for Classics of Marxism-Leninism". As before, this was combined with work in the press department of the Comintern.

=== Professor? ===
According to sources that take their lead from official information made available after 1949 by the East German Socialist Unity Party, during or soon after 1940 Leo Stern received his habilitation (higher university degree), which would have opened the way to a full professorship and, under normal circumstances, a life-long teaching career in the Soviet universities sector. It was at the instigation of Klawdija Kirsanowa that he was installed, in June 1940, as a professor of Modern at Moscow State University. In this capacity he taught both at the university and at the Moscow Pedagogical Institute. Kirsanowa, who at this time was a leading figure at the People's Commissariat for Education and at the International Lenin School, based her support for Stern's appointment partly on articles he had recently had published in Soviet specialist journals. She may also have been impressed by three substantial essays Stern had produced back in Vienna, when still under the mentorship of Max Adler, and from which lengthy exerts had subsequently been reproduced in Soviet academic publications during 1936/37. But Kirsanowa's backing for Stern's professorial appointment was based chiefly on a piece of work he had produced more recently on "Contemporary Social and Political Catholicism".

Mystery persists, however, given that no printed version of Stern's dissertation on contemporary Catholicism ever appeared. According to detailed biographical essay provided by the University of Halle, where Leo Stern built his career and considerable reputation as a historian after 1950, the Moscow habilitation qualification has "still not been authenticated".

Leo Stern was an able linguist. Alongside German and Russian, he had usable English, French, Italian and Spanish. For several months during 1940 he was assigned as a specialist in foreign-languages literature on socio-economics with the "All Russian Committee for University Affairs".

=== Red Army ===
On 22 June 1941 the Germany army launched a massive invasion of the Soviet Union, in flagrant defiance of the (formally still in most respects secret) non-aggression pact concluded between the German and Soviet dictators slightly less than two years earlier. In Moscow, Leo Stern volunteered for service with the Soviet Red Army on 7 July 1941. He served as a Soviet army officer between 1942 and 1945, concluding the war as a bemedaled "Lieutenant Colonel", and then serving for a further five years as an officer in the Soviet army of occupation in Vienna. Records indicate that during the initial part of his time with the Red Army he was assigned to a number of "special projects", at least some of which seem to have involved desk-bound work. During the early part of 1942 he composed a series of "teaching aids" on Austrian History and the History of the Austrian Labour Movement for the "International Lenin School", relocated, between 1941 and 1943, from Moscow to Kushnarenkovo in Bashkortostan. Of possibly greater immediate importance in terms of Soviet strategic objectives was the work Stern undertook with Johann Koplenig to create a "Committee of Austrian Liberation Movements".

In October 1942 he was posted to the battle front at Stalingrad, taking part in the fighting till the capitulation of what was left of the German army there on 2 February 1943. He was then transferred to the fighting on the Southwestern Front till May 1943 before being moved again in order to work on a series of "special projects" for the Soviet Information Bureau (international press agency) which occupied his time till September 1944. He then returned to the fighting front for the final months of the war, participating as a member of the army that liberated Vienna in April 1945. In the immediate aftermath of the war he was frequently called upon to work as a simultaneous translator for Marshal Tolbukhin and other Soviet leaders of what was now a Soviet army of occupation. His formal position was as "Cultural Officer", however. He continued to serve as a senior Red Army officer of the Soviet Control Commission in Vienna till 1950, despite having been "demobilised" in respect of military operations in September 1945.

=== Karl Renner ===
In the aftermath of the war, the Soviet commanders were keen to stabilise the situation in Vienna on Soviet terms as rapidly as possible, in part so as to forestall any alternative versions of post-war Vienna that American military commanders approaching from the west might have in mind. Stalin already had a carefully picked "Austrian government in exile" which he was about to fly in from Moscow when Marshal Tolbukhin, the military leader "on the ground", persuaded the Soviet leader that it would be better and quicker to install a government under Karl Renner who was already in Vienna and was well networked with surviving Austrian politicians of the political centre-left. Despite his longstanding socialist credentials Karl Renner was hopelessly compromised in the eyes of a younger generation of Austrian socialists and communists, however, on account of his record during the 1930s of compromising with Austro-fascism and, after 1938, urging Austrians to vote in favour of what mounted to the annexation of Austria and its summary integration into Hitler's Germany. As an Austrian citizen who was also a Red Army officer, Leo Stern was in a position to argue bitterly with senior Soviet officers against the installation of 74 year-old Karl Renner as Austrian Chancellor in April 1945 and as Austrian president in December 1945. The decision to appoint Renner, who was perceived by many as a longstanding anti-Semite, as head of government had already been taken by Tolbukhin and endorsed by Moscow, however.

There are two not entirely complementary versions of Leo Stern's role in Renner's appointment. According to sources drawing on information subsequently approved by the ruling East German Socialist Unity Party, Stern loyally complied with the orders relayed to him by his commanding officer and helped push through the Renner appointment. Other sources insist that he refused to involve himself in it. Stern shared his recollections of the matter later with his friend, the antifascist jurist Eduard Rabofsky: "Let me tell you, I was one of the political officers in the army staff meeting at Hochwolkersdorf who took an unchanging and very well based position against calling in Renner. But after several days, when a statement came through directly from Moscow about my opinions, General Sheltov, the commander of the political department of the 3rd Ukrainian Front [which had just liberated Vienna from fascism] ordered me not to utter another word about Karl Renner. As a soldier, I have obeyed that order to this day". (Note: "Jetzt werde ich Dir sagen, daß ich in Hochwolkersdorf einer jener unter den politischen Offizieren des Armeestabes war, der dauernd und höchst begründet gegen eine Heranziehung von Renner Stellung nahm. Aber nach einigen Tagen, als zu meinen Ansichten direkt aus Moskau eine Äußerung kam, erteilte mir General Sheltow, der Leiter der politischen Abteilung der 3. ukrainischen Front, den Befehl, kein Wort mehr über Renner von mir zu geben. Daran habe ich mich als Soldat bis heute gehalten".)

=== Post-war Vienna ===
Multi-party politics had returned to Austria with the fall of National Socialism, and behind the scenes he pushed for a merger between the Social Democratic Party and the Communist party in order to reduce the risk that political divisions on the political left might again open the way for populist tyranny from the right. He shared the enthusiasm of many comrades when the local parties at Bruck an der Mur implemented such a merger. Others Vienna communists judged that after the nightmare of Hitlerism, the Communist party would be able to win any national election without the need to draw support from the centre-left Social Democrats. Stern's former political ally Ernst Fischer took this view. and arranged for the local party merger at Bruck to be reversed. Stern evidently took Fischer's intervention personally. The November 1945 general election demonstrated that the Communists were nothing like as popular as party comrades had assumed in the wake of Vienna's liberation by the Red Army, but the party merger lost its momentum and, at least in Austria, there was never again any serious discussion of a merger between the two traditionally largest parties of the political left.

Meanwhile, between 1945 and 1950 Stern served as head of the "Agitation Department" of the Party Central Committee, remaining an influential voice at the party's top table even as the party itself became ever more marginalised in Austrian post-war politics.

Starting in 1945 or 1946, Stern started to teach as a "guest lecturer" at the University of Vienna. In addition, in 1946 he accepted an appointment as head of the Social Sciences Department at the Vienna Institute for Sciences, Arts and Humanities. In 1946/47 he took a "visiting professorship" at the "Vienna Academy for International Trade" (as the "WU" was then known). In a letter dated 17 February 1947 which he addressed to the University Rector Ludwig Adamovich, Stern announced that "in account of overwork and bureaucratic obstructions [he] was currently not in a position" to continue with his programme of guest lectures at the University of Vienna. There is no reason to doubt that the expressions of regret in the replies he received from Adamovich and from the Dean of the Law Faculty in respect of this resignation were genuine. As the decade drew towards its close Stern continued to teach at the "Vienna Academy for International Trade": he worked on a significant research project for the Soviet Academy of Sciences and Humanities.

By 1947 it was obvious that the politics of the Austrian Communist Party, and across occupied Austria more generally, were not unfolding as Leo Stern had hoped; while he himself had less power to influence events than, given his own links to Soviet military leaders and intelligence circles, he might have anticipated. The country itself would remain under military occupation, geographically divided into zones of occupation, till 1955. That provided a context of constraint and unreality to public affairs, and to the competing political pressures impinging on the universities sector. Furthermore, according to at least one source, Leo Stern was aware of a powerful toxic undercurrent of antisemitism persisting in the country's emerging political establishment. On 1 May 1947 he was physically attacked during a local election meeting at Klein-Pöchlarn, a country town to the west of Vienna. He sustained injuries in the course of an incident blamed on "reactionary forces" with support from the socialist Arbeiter-Zeitung (newspaper). Although the Klein-Pöchlarn attack seems to have been the only serious physical assault that Stern suffered during his time in post-war Vienna, it was followed by a series of verbal personal attacks in respect of which it was all too easy to infer quiet endorsement by powerful residual antisemitic elements in the universities establishment.

=== Alice Melber ===
It was probably soon after arriving with the Soviet liberating army that, in 1945, Leo Stern met and married Alice Melber, hitherto a young anti-fascist resistance activist under the German "occupation". Their children were born in 1946 and 1949. Manfred Stern (1946–2018) would follow his father into the universities sector, becoming a professor of Mathematics, with a particular focus on Algebra and Lattice Theory, at the University of Halle. Sylvia Stern would become a physician at Springe am Deister, near Hannover.

=== Halle ===
Early in 1950, in response to an invitation received from the Minister for People's Education in the State government for Saxony-Anhalt, Leo Stern relocated with his family to Halle to what had been administered, till a few months earlier, as the Soviet occupation zone of Germany. In October 1949, responding to equivalent developments in the western zones earlier that year, the Soviet occupation zone was rebranded and relaunched as the German Democratic Republic (East Germany). Halle was home to one of the new country's leading universities. On 1 March 1950 Leo Stern took up the professorial chair at the university for "Modern History, with respect to the Labour Movement". He was the fifth "big fish" among Marxist historians appointed to top university positions in the German Democratic Republic following the country's launch, after Jürgen Kuczynski, Alfred Meusel (both at Berlin since 1946), Walter Markov and Ernst Engelberg (at Leipzig since 1948 and 1949). In 1952 Stern was appointed director of the university's Institute for German History, a position he retained till 1966.

On leaving Austria in 1950 Leo Stern resigned his member ship of the Austrian Communist Party and immediately joined East Germany's Socialist Unity Party (Sozialistische Einheitspartei Deutschlands/ SED). The SED had been formed four years earlier by means of a contentious merger – which never really took effect beyond the confines of the Soviet occupation zone – between the Communist Party of Germany and the (East German) Social Democratic Party. Ironically, it was a party merger very similar to the one that Stern had advocated, without conspicuous support from party comrades, for Austria during 1945. It is likely that the party merger in what became East Germany succeeded precisely because party comrades in Moscow, concerned by the unexpected electoral humiliation suffered by the (unmerged) Austrian Communist Party in November 1945, were persuaded by the experience to contribute muscular hands-on backing for the equivalent party merger achieved in April 1946 in the Soviet Zone / East Germany. In 1952 Leo Stern was granted East German citizenship and became a member of the district leadership team (Bezirksleitung) for the local party in Halle. Despite a somewhat bumpy relationship with the party establishment over the next few years, he remained a member of the Halle party leadership without a break till 1959 or 1960.

As early as 1951, Leo Stern was appointed University pro-rector, with direct responsibility for the politically important "Basic Social Sciences" course which all students were required to complete as a precondition for progressing to their chosen degree subjects. As a result of the "illness" of Eduard Winter, the University Rector, by the end of 1951 Leo Stern had also become, officially, the "Acting Rector", undertaking the administrative tasks that would otherwise have been the responsibility of Eduard Winter, his fellow historian. The two men already knew each other, both having been born in the Austro-Hungarian empire, and the two of them having worked closely together directly after the war at the Vienna Institute for Sciences, Arts and Humanities. They had been united (with others) by a shared determination to re-establish and re-launch Austrian scholarship through the working together of all academics keen to establish a new world, based on truth and reality, unclouded by illusion. After 1950, again finding themselves as colleagues at Halle, there was no equivalent meeting of minds between Stern and Winter, however. An article contributed by Winter for a three volume tome to be published for in celebration of the university's 450th anniversary was rejected by the project's editor-producer who found it superficial. Winter already had a well-established academic reputation, and it is not impossible that there were political undercurrents involved at which sources only hint. In 1951 Eduard Winter began to teach at Berlin University, resigning the rectorship and leaving his other academic posts at the University of Halle at the same time. In October 1953, prompted by a recommendation the previous year from the party Halle district leadership team, Leo Stern was himself appointed University Rector (Chief Officer and Administrator) at the Martin Luther University of Halle-Wittenberg. Stern's seven year incumbency, which came after two years during which the economist Rudolf Agricola had filled the position, was not without controversy, but as an organiser and administrator, belying the characteristics imputed by some sources to history professors in general, he proved highly competent.

=== Rector ===
Early in during his time as rector a senior party officer at the university included in his report to the Ministry of State Security (whose responsibilities included keeping track of such matters) the assessment that Stern, as University Rector, did not have good relations with university staff, which was reflected in an atmosphere of varying levels of general anxiety among the university personnel. Viewed from other angles, such anxiety was not without reason, since Stern saw it as his job to run the university in the spirit of the country's ruling political party. Several "purges" were carried out during his tenure, notably in 1958 when he moved against the so-called "Spirituskreis" (loosely, "Spiritual circle"), a little group of unacceptably "bourgeois" professors. Earlier on, in 1952 and 1953 he several times used his influence with the university senate to stop protest actions by university deans in support of students arrested in the context of the growing discontent that preceded the brief but savagely suppressed (with the active participation of Soviet troops) uprising of June 1953. Also controversial among comrades at the university was the way in which Stern was content to appoint former Nazis to professorial chairs, and, where appropriate, reappoint them, provided they proved dutiful and compliant backers of the party under the new kind of one-party dictatorship that had been installed in the East German state, built according to Soviet-style Leninist-Socialist principles, on foundations that had, before 1949, been the Soviet occupation zone. From the point of view of sympathetic sources, Stern felt secure in the belief that he had come across plenty of committed left-winger activists who, having once acquired status and position, had been content to betray and abandon the labour movement. There was no monopoly of political betrayal for the political right.

=== "Zeitschrift für Geschichtswissenschaft" ===
Also in 1953, Leo Stern, Alfred Meusel and Heinz Kamnitzer co-founded and for several years co-produced the Zeitschrift für Geschichtswissenschaft (ZfG), a monthly academic journal for serious historians, in which Leo Stern himself published several very substantial contributions. It was noted that despite his own Jewish provenance and record as a Red Army officer in the war against Hitler's Germany, at the ZfG, just as with his appointments at the university, he never shied away from commissioning contributions from scholars identified as "former Nazis", just as long as they demonstrated appropriate historical knowledge, insight and detachment in their submissions.

Stern also instigated the launch of the series "Archivalische Forschungen zur Geschichte der deutschen Arbeiterbewegung" (loosely, "Archival Researches on the History of the German Labour Movement"). Stern was involved in the creation of several other learned journals, but Zeitschrift für Geschichtswissenschaft stands out as unusual because, after nearly seventy years, it is one of very few academic journals founded in the single-party German Democratic Republic which successfully transitioned reunification in 1990 and is still, in 2021, published monthly.

=== Academy of Sciences and Humanities ===
In 1952 Stern was proposed for membership of the prestigious [East] German Academy of Sciences and Humanities. His three proposers were the pre-historian Wilhelm Unverzagt (1892–1971), the professor of ancient history Ernst Hohl (1886–1957) and the jurist-philosopher Arthur Baumgarten (1884–1966). A fourth, the agronomist Asmus Petersen (1900–1962), added himself to the list of proposers on 24 April 1952. The proposal nevertheless failed. It may have been on account of contacts established when fighting alongside Soviet comrades in the Red Army or it may simply have been through an above average level of self-belief that throughout the 1950s Stern seems to have been less accommodating to the opinions of colleagues and comrades than was normal in East German universities. It is certainly the case that election to the academy was, by the standards of western academic institutions at that time, a highly politicised process. The party was, to the full extent possible, omnipresent, and the early 1950s were a nervous time for the East German party leadership as they struggled to establish and extend party control in the face of acute economic austerity across the country. Stern's candidacy for membership seems to have had backing from leading figures in the university community that extended far beyond his four proposers. That it nevertheless failed demonstrates, in the opinion of one commentator, determination on the part of a small number of influential activist hard-line communists in the party hierarchy to crush and eliminate "bourgeois thinking" among academic colleagues during the early years of the East German dictatorship. With regard to "bourgeois thinking" it may have counted against Stern's candidacy that one of his four proposers was a former member of the National Socialist ("Nazi") Party (albeit – as far as one can tell – fully exonerated and/or rehabilitated after 1945) and another had spent the Hitler years exiled in Switzerland.

Stern's next membership proposal for membership of the Academy was yet more carefully choreographed. It was formulated and submitted by Alfred Meusel, seconded by Wolfgang Steinitz (1905–1967). In a country where scholarship was traditionally respected, these were two of the most high-profile university professors of their generation. Steinitz was a close friend of Jürgen Kuczynski who, despite his slightly semi-detached attitude to the political establishment, had achieved iconic status with party leaders, partly on account of his long-standing ties to Soviet intelligence. The main speaker in support of Stern's candidacy, Carl Max Maedge (1884–1969), was unstinting in his praise of Stern's scholarly merits. When it came to a vote, Leo Stern was elected a member of the [East] German Academy of Sciences and Humanities on 29 December 1954. His installation as a full "ordinary member" of the academy took effect on 24 February 1955. The next year he took over as head of the history department at the Academy.

Although he continued to live in Halle, Leo Stern's responsibilities at the Academy in Berlin after 1956 involved him in frequent involvement with Eduard Winter. Relations between the two men had been frosty ever since they had worked together at Halle back in 1950/51, when the roles of university pro-rector and o university rector had overlapped uncomfortably before Winter's transfer to Berlin at the end of 1951. Relations soured further during the 1950s. More generally, the little quarrels, jealousies and vanities between university professors tended to focus on Stern as the decade progressed. Jürgen Kuczynski, like Stern, was elected to membership of the Academy only in 1955. They were both exceptionally erudite History professors of Jewish provenance with a long-standing focus on labour-movement history and long-standing links to the political establishment in Moscow and – almost certainly – to the world of Soviet intelligence. They might have been expected to have much in common, but Kuczynski somehow managed to become an "aristocrat of communism" as Stern never would; and relations between the two men alwats remained distant. The historian-economist Kuczynski was a prolific author. His autobiographical memoires published in the 1990s become at times almost garrulous when the author discusses academic colleagues: they make absolutely no mention of Leo Stern, however. Nevertheless, through the robustness of his own intellect and academic rigour Leo Stern emerged during the later 1950s as one of the most influential historians of the German Democratic Republic, never slow to tangle with what he, as a Marxist historian, would have characterised as the "disorienting reactionary interpretations" to be identified in the "bourgeois" historiography of the period, championed in the other Germany by men such as Hermann Heimpel at Göttingen or Gerhard Ritter at Freiburg.

=== Dismissal ===
By the end of the 1950s Stern had become a member of the History Advisory Board at the East German Secretariat for Higher Education. During this time party loyalists among his younger colleagues produced a textbook on German History. A member of a later generation of east German historians later dismissed the work as "incompetent". It was nevertheless used for teaching history at East Germany universities for three decades between 1959 and 1989. This provides context for Stern's dismissal from his position as rector of the Martin Luther University of Halle-Wittenberg in February 1959, through what one source describes as "an intrigue by party comrades" and another describes simply as "internal party conflicts". In view of the close links between the universities and the party it is unremarkable that Stern reacted by submitted a letter of complaint to the Party Central Committee, but this was without obvious effect. Following his dismissal from the rectorate he also lost his membership of the Halle local party leadership team (Bezirksleitung). According to one source, it was only through the personal intervention of First Party Secretary Walter Ulbricht, that Stern was "spared further humiliations". The list of honorary doctorates and "state honours" which Leo Stern received during the final 23 years of his life, between 1959 and 1982, indicates that, slightly unusually, his falling out with the party leadership in Halle in 1959 was not followed by any national fall from grace.

=== Later years ===
Nor was there any shortage of important work related to his position as a leading East German historian. Meanwhile, the administrative and organisational duties that had been Stern's as Halle university rector now passed to his successor in the position, the economist Gerhard Bondi. While sidelined at Halle, Stern remained active in Berlin as a member, and later as chairman, of the History Advisory Board at the East German Secretariat for Higher Education. Although his published works on the history of the labour movement and his tally of awards during the 1960s demonstrate the effectiveness of his determination to sustain good relations with the party establishment, it is evident that he continued to be a focus of mistrust at some levels inside the homeland security services. When surviving files from old the Ministry for State Security were made available to researchers after 1990, several volumes stuffed full with reports and associated commentaries, bear testimony to the very extensive state surveillance to which Stern was subjected, even by the standards of East German surveillance state, and even after removal from his high-profile role at Halle in 1960.

At the academy in Berlin, Stern served in succession to Wolfgang Steinitz between 1963 and 1968 as Academy Vice-president and as chairman of the academy's working group for Social Sciences institutes and facilities. After that he served between 1968 and 1981 as director of the academy's History Research Centre.

Leo Stern died at Halle a few weeks short of what would have been his 82nd birthday on 2 or 3 January 1982.

== Recognition (selection) ==
- Order of the Great Patriotic War 1st class (Soviet Union)
- 1955: National Prize of the German Democratic Republic 2nd class
- 1961: Honorary doctorate from the Martin Luther University of Halle-Wittenberg
- 1961: Patriotic Order of Merit in silver
- 1965: Honorary doctorate from the Comenius University in Bratislava
- 1966: Exceptional People's Scholar (Hervorragender Wissenschaftler des Volkes)
- 1971: Order of Karl Marx
- 1974: Star of People's Friendship
- 1976: Patriotic Order of Merit in gold
- 1976 Honorary Senator at the Martin Luther University of Halle-Wittenberg
- 1981: Patriotic Order of Merit gold clasp
- 1989 (posthumously): Halle's Polytechnic Secondary School Nr. 30 was renamed as the "Prof. Dr. Leo Stern Secondary School" (Prof. Dr. Leo Stern Oberschule)
