= Josef Stern =

Austrian priest (1797–1871)

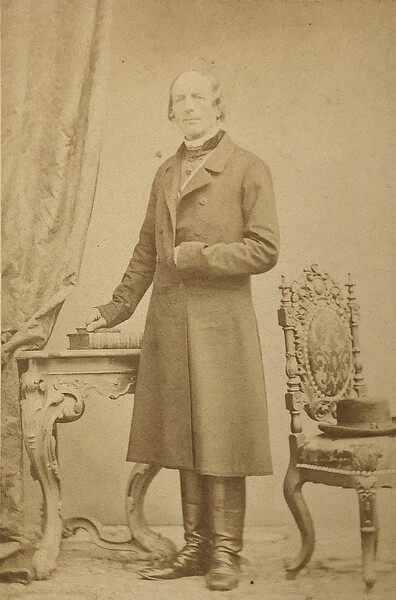

Josef Stern (14 March 1797 – 11 May 1871) was an Austrian priest and a promoter of beekeeping. He wrote an early guide to beekeeping and was among the first to notice foulbrood disease. He worked at the Augustinian Canons' Monastery of St. Florian at Wachau.

Stern was born in Alberndorf in Pulkautal (Lower Austria), the son of farmers Georg and Elenora née Widl Josef. He was educated at the Augustinian Canons' Monastery of St. Florian and was ordained priest in 1823. He worked in various churches first at Windhaag near Freistadt at Regau from 1824 and at Vöcklabruck from 1826. In 1841 he moved to Weißenkirchen in the Wachau where he worked as a pastor until his death. He spent his leisure in agricultural activities including the growing of grapes and beekeeping. He conducted experiments in the parish vineyard and produced a report on viticulture and winemaking in Wachau. He began to promote a grape variety to deal with a decline in wine production from the region in the 1860s. His wine won him a bronze medal at the Kremser Volksfest in 1864. Stern's work on beekeeping came a time when other pioneers were working in the region. He agreed with Johann Dzierzon that male bees arose from unfertilized eggs. He was able to identify the radius within which a hive operated as about 3 to 4 kilometers.
