= Leonard J. Stern =

American judge

Associate Justice of the Ohio Supreme Court
- In office August 1970 – January 1, 1977
- Appointed by: Jim Rhodes
- Preceded by: C. William O'Neill
- Succeeded by: Ralph S. Locher

Personal details
- Born: October 4, 1904 Cleveland, Ohio
- Died: May 21, 1988 (aged 83) Columbus, Ohio
- Resting place: Forest Lawn Memorial Gardens and Mausoleum, Columbus
- Party: Republican
- Spouse: Anastasia Percin
- Children: two
- Education: Cleveland–Marshall College of Law

Leonard J. Stern (October 4, 1904 – May 21, 1988) was a Republican lawyer from Ohio who served as a Common Pleas judge, an appeals court judge and from 1970 to 1977 was a justice of the Ohio Supreme Court.

Leonard J. Stern was born in Cleveland, Ohio on October 4, 1904, the son of Benjamin and Hermine (Markovitz) Stern. He managed his father's grocery store while working his way through Cleveland–Marshall College of Law. He graduated in 1926, was admitted to the bar, and went into private practice in Cleveland. He was a bailiff of the Cuyahoga County Court of Common Pleas.

In 1939, Stern and his family moved to Columbus, Ohio, where he was corporate counsel in the office of Ohio Secretary of State Earl Griffith. In 1940 he became executive secretary to the Ohio Board of Public Works, which he held for six years. He then went into private practice in Columbus.

In 1965, Governor Jim Rhodes appointed Stern to the Franklin County Court of Common Pleas, and he won a six-year term in 1966. He was appointed by Rhodes in 1969 to Ohio's 10th District Court of Appeals.

In March 1970, Chief Justice of the Ohio Supreme Court Kingsley A. Taft died. On April 3, 1970, Governor Rhodes elevated Associate Justice C. William O'Neill to Chief Justice, creating a vacancy on the court. In August of that year, Rhodes appointed Stern to fill the remaining months of O'Neill's term. Stern won election to a six-year term in November 1970. He was unable to run for re-election in 1976 because he exceeded the 70 year age limit for judicial election proscribed in the Ohio Constitution.

After retirement, Stern served as the first disciplinary counsel to the Supreme Courtand was a member of the Ohio Court of Claims.

On November 13, 1931, Stern married Anastasia Percin in Cleveland. They had two children. Stern died May 21, 1988. His funeral was at Temple Israel in Columbus, and burial was at Forest Lawn Memorial Gardens and Mausoleum, Columbus.
