= Becquerel (lunar crater) =

Lunar impact crater

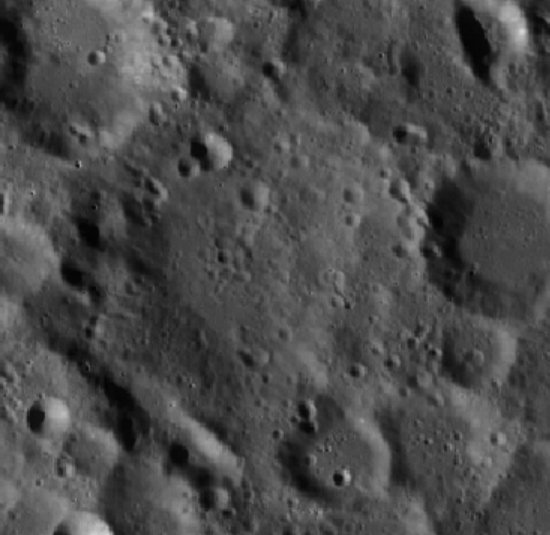
- LRO mosaic
- Coordinates: 40.7°N 129.7°E
- Diameter: 65 km
- Depth: Unknown
- Colongitude: 232° at sunrise
- Eponym: A. Henri Becquerel

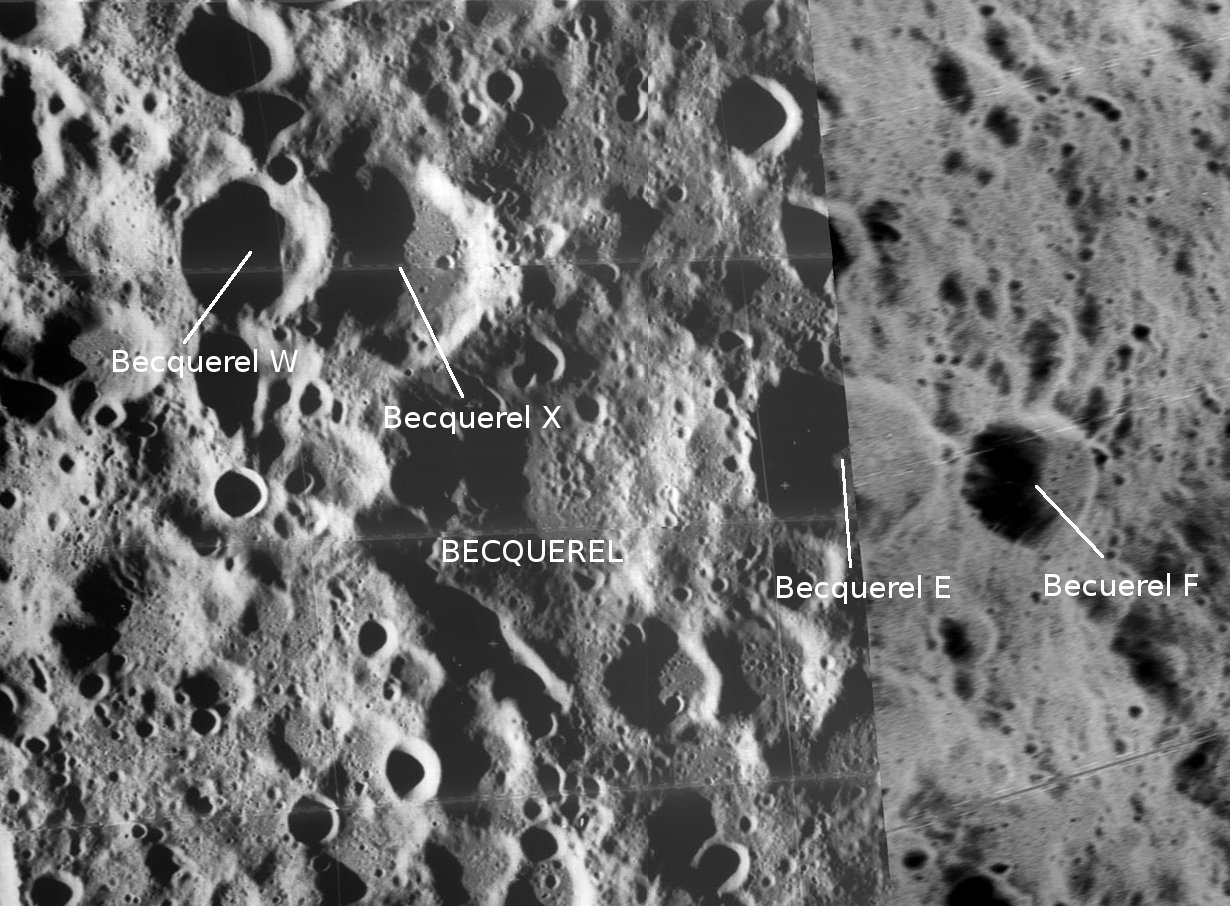
Becquerel with satellite craters

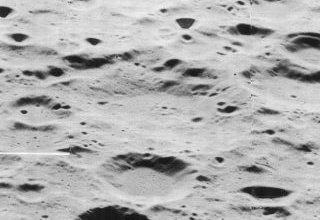
Oblique Lunar Orbiter 5 image

Becquerel is a lunar impact crater that lies in the northern hemisphere on the far side of the Moon. This is an ancient and heavily worn formation that is now little more than an irregular depression in the surface. The outer rim has been worn and reshaped until it forms a rugged, mountainous region around the flatter interior.

The most notable of the formations on the rim is Becquerel X, which is part of a double crater along the northwestern rim. There is a short valley paralleling the southwestern rim, most likely formed by the merging of several small craters. The interior floor of Becquerel is relatively flat, but with rough sections and several tiny craterlets marking the surface. There is a dark patch (low albedo) on the floor near the southern rim.

To the west of Becquerel are H. G. Wells and Tesla, to the north is Segers, to the northeast is Bridgman, and to the south is Van Maanen.

This crater is named after French physicist A. Henri Becquerel (1852–1908), a 1903 Nobel laureate in Physics. Its designation was formally adopted by the International Astronomical Union in 1970.

== Satellite craters ==
By convention these features are identified on lunar maps by placing the letter on the side of the crater midpoint that is closest to Becquerel.

Becquerel	Latitude	Longitude	Diameter
E	41.0° N	131.5° E	32 km
F	40.9° N	132.9° E	21 km
W	42.2° N	126.9° E	27 km
X	42.2° N	128.1° E	34 km
