= Appleton (crater) =

Lunar impact crater

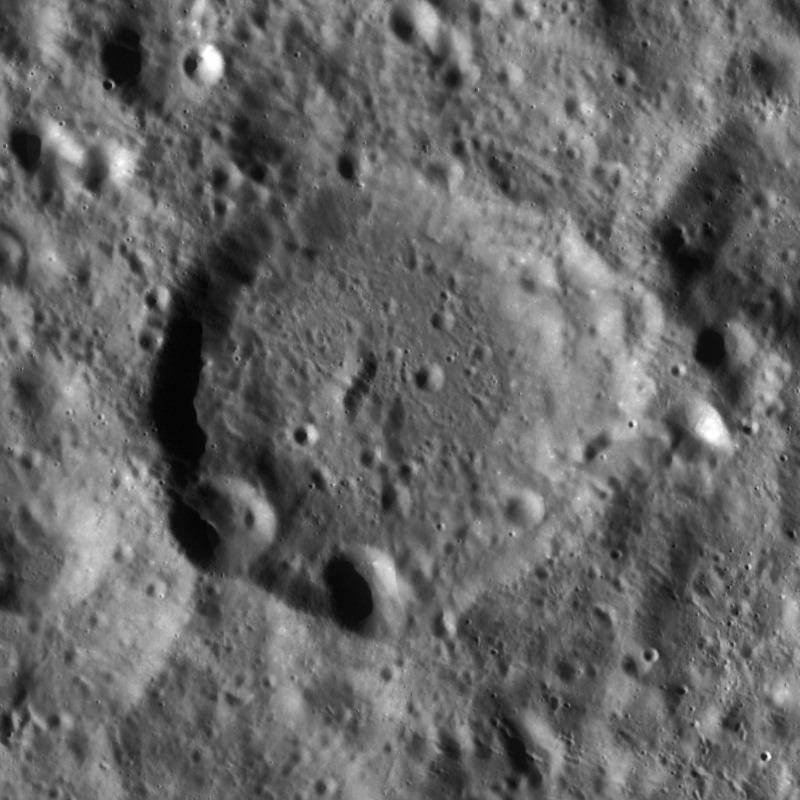
- LRO image
- Coordinates: 37.05°N 158.17°E
- Diameter: 64.59 km (40.13 mi)
- Depth: Unknown
- Colongitude: 203° at sunrise
- Formation: Nectarian
- Eponym: Edward V. Appleton

Appleton is a heavily eroded lunar impact crater that lies in the northern hemisphere on the far side of the Moon. To the northwest are the craters Von Neumann and Campbel. The smaller Golovin lies to the northeast, while further to the southwest is the Mare Moscoviense.

This formation dates to the Nectarian epoch of the lunar geologic timescale. The crater wall and interior have been heavily eroded by many subsequent impacts, leaving the features rounded and irregular. A pair of craters lie across the southwestern rim, and two small craters lie along the eastern rim. The interior floor is irregular.

This crater is named after British physicist Edward V. Appleton (1892–1965). Prior to its name being formally adopted by the IAU in 1970, Appleton was called Crater 129.

Appleton lies between satellite craters that are located on opposite sides of the rim. Appleton R is located just to the west-southwest, and contains another crater just inside its north rim. On the opposite side of Appleton is Appleton D, a comparably sized formation to Appleton R.

== Satellite craters ==
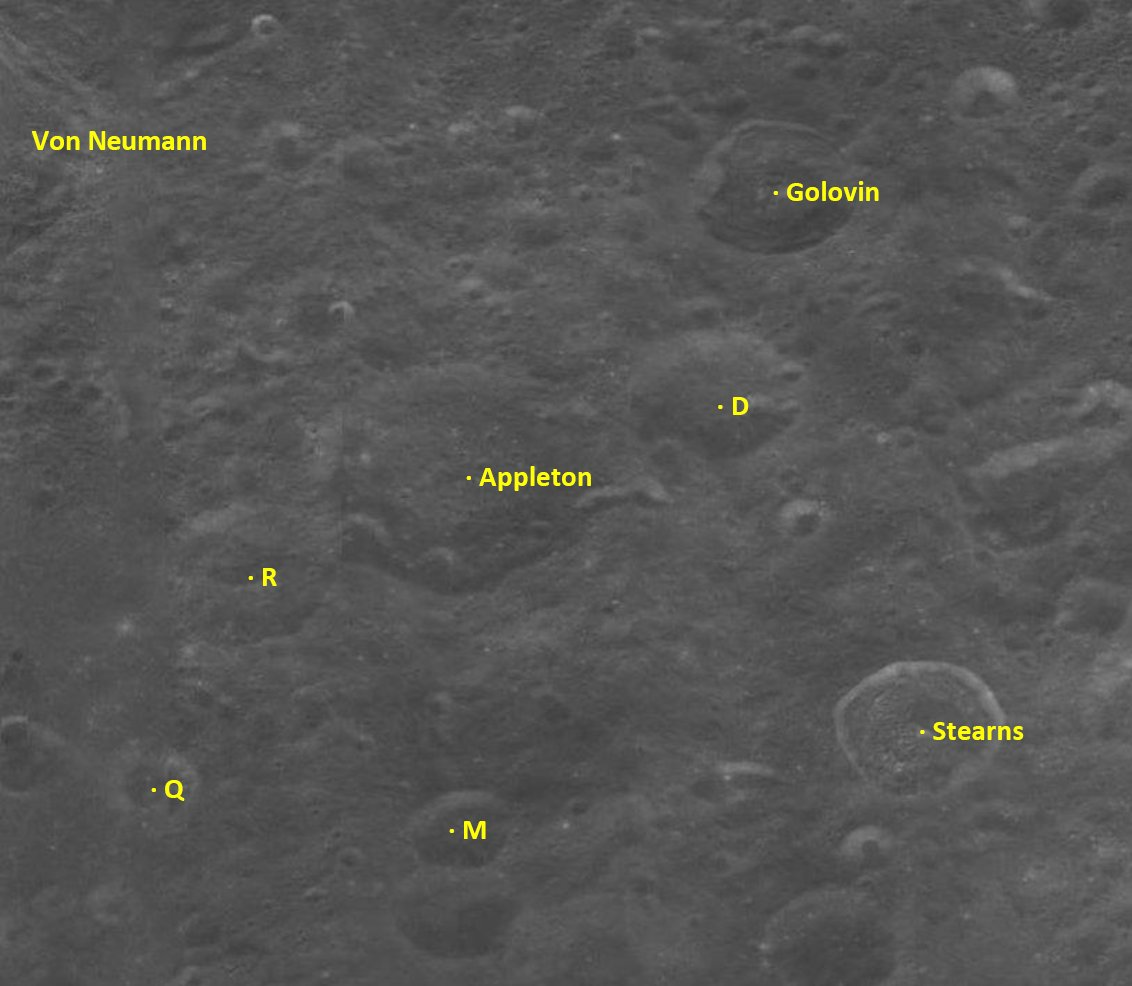
Satellite features of Appleton

By convention these features are identified on lunar maps by placing the letter on the side of the crater midpoint that is closest to Appleton.

| Appleton | Latitude | Longitude | Diameter |
|---|---|---|---|
| D | 38.0° N | 160.6° E | 37 km |
| M | 33.9° N | 158.3° E | 21 km |
| Q | 34.3° N | 155.3° E | 26 km |
| R | 36.2° N | 156.2° E | 39 km |
