= Bridgman (crater) =

Lunar impact crater

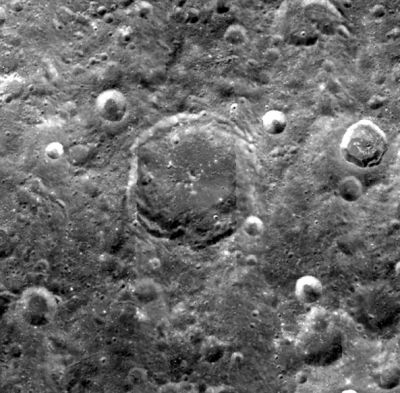
- Clementine mosaic
- Coordinates: 43.39°N 136.98°E
- Diameter: 81.89 km (50.88 mi)
- Depth: Unknown
- Colongitude: 223° at sunrise
- Formation: Imbrian
- Eponym: Percy W. Bridgman

Bridgman is a lunar impact crater that is located on the far side of the Moon. It lies in the northern hemisphere, to the northwest of the crater Kurchatov. To the west-southwest is the old formation Becquerel, and eastward are the craters Pawsey and Wiener.

This formation is dated to the Imbrian period of the lunar geologic timescale. The prominent outer wall of Bridgman is only somewhat worn, and retains much of its original detail including traces of terrace structures and slumping. The rim is not quite circular, having a slight polygonal appearance with rounded corners. There is a notable inward bulge of the wall at the south end. The interior floor is generally level, with a central peak formation at the midpoint. The infrared spectrum of pure crystalline plagioclase has been identified on the crater center and north wall.

This crater is named after American physicist Percy W. Bridgman (1882–1961). Prior to formal naming by the IAU in 1970, Bridgman was called Crater 52.

== Satellite craters ==
By convention these features are identified on lunar maps by placing the letter on the side of the crater midpoint that is closest to Bridgman.

Bridgman	Latitude	Longitude	Diameter
C	46.7° N	140.2° E	35 km
E	44.1° N	141.7° E	29 km
F	44.0° N	141.2° E	51 km

== Gallery ==
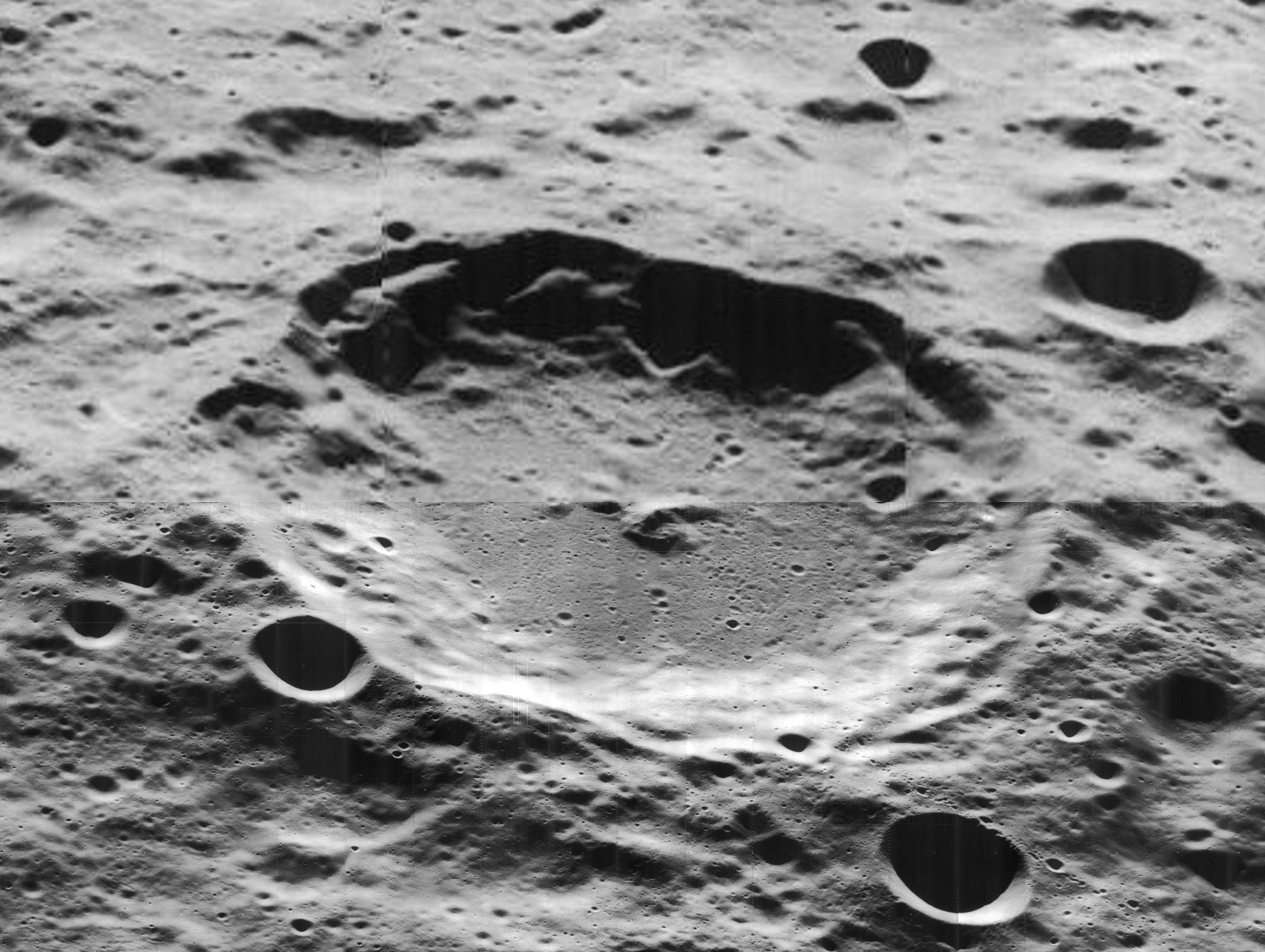
Oblique Lunar Orbiter 5 image mosaic

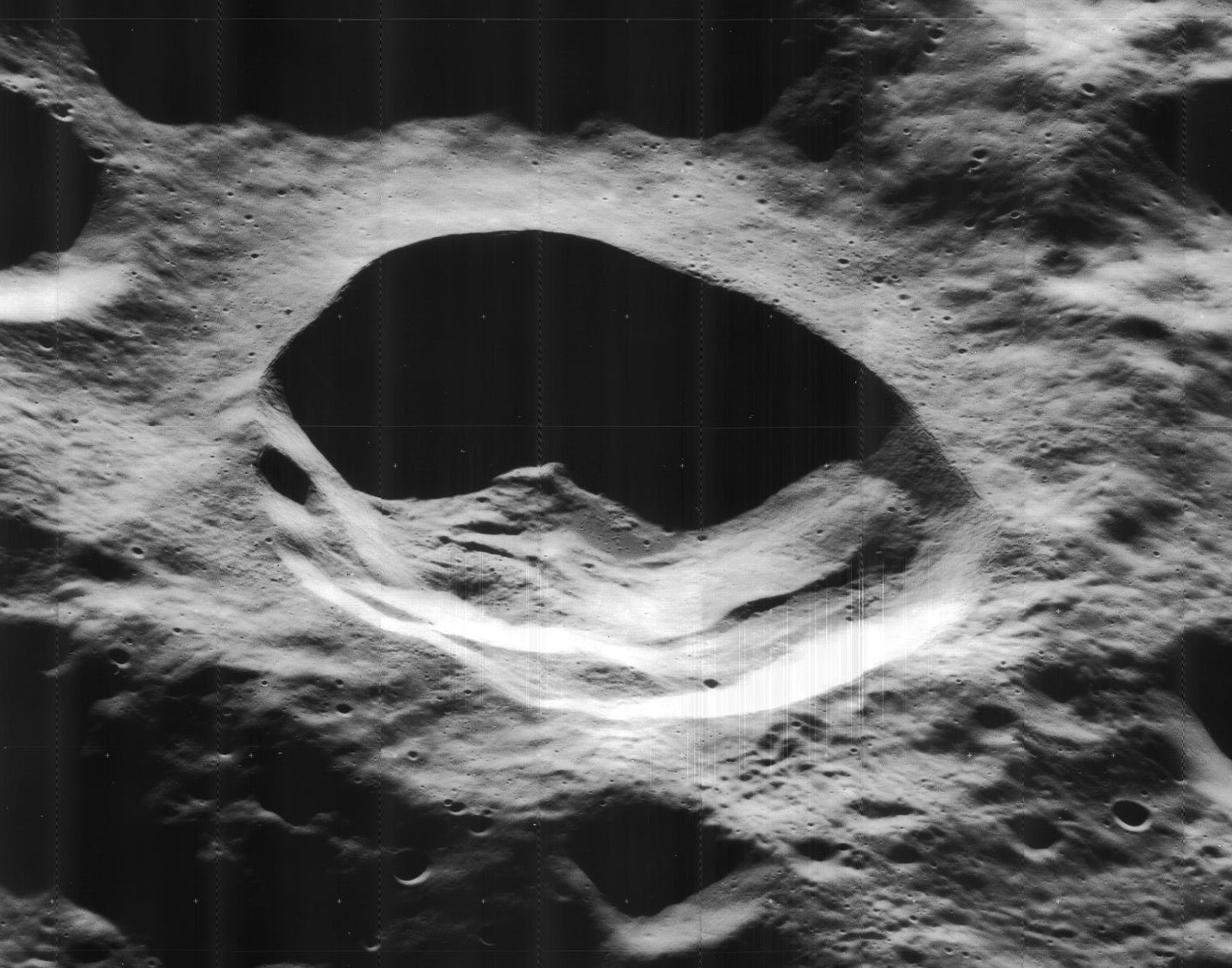
Bridgman E crater has a sharp rim and is relatively fresh
