= Millikan (crater) =

Crater on the Moon

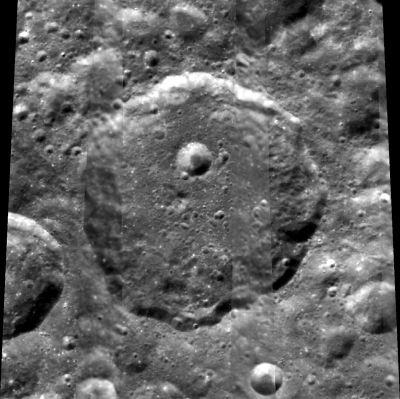
- Clementine mosaic
- Coordinates: 46.76°N 121.52°E
- Diameter: 93.97 km (58.39 mi)
- Depth: Unknown
- Colongitude: 240° at sunrise
- Eponym: Robert A. Millikan

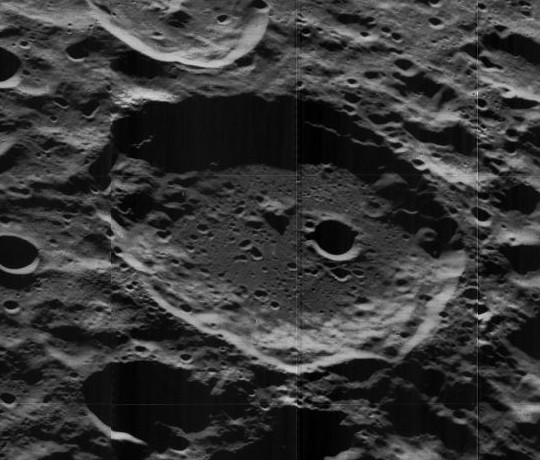
Oblique Lunar Orbiter 5 image, facing west

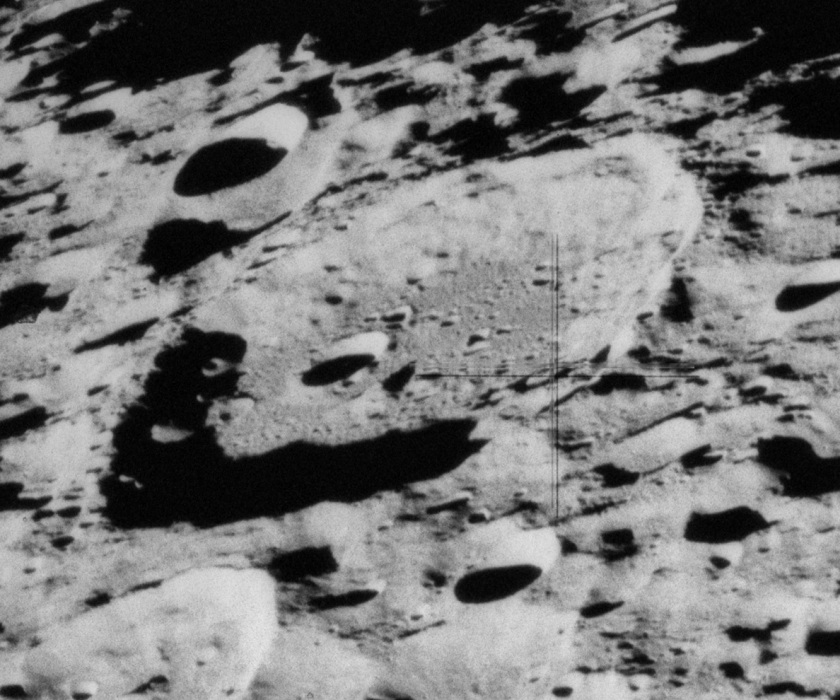
Oblique Apollo 16 mapping camera image

Millikan is a lunar impact crater in the northern hemisphere of the Moon's far side. It is located to the north of the crater H. G. Wells, and to the southwest of von Békésy.

This formation dates to the Nectarian epoch of the lunar geologic timescale. The rim edge of Millikan is roughly circular and well-defined, but with some irregularities. There are some small outward bulges along the south and east where the edge has slumped inwards somewhat. The inner walls lacks a terrace structure that is seen, for example, in the smaller Cantor to the south.

The interior floor of Millikan is relatively level, and there is a small, bowl-shaped crater to the north of the midpoint. Offset to the west of the middle is a low central peak. The floor is marked by a number of tiny craterlets.

Prior to formal naming by the IAU in 1970, Millikan was called Crater 47.

== Satellite craters ==
By convention these features are identified on lunar maps by placing the letter on the side of the crater midpoint that is closest to Millikan.

Millikan	Latitude	Longitude	Diameter
B	49.8° N	123.5° E	21 km
J	45.8° N	124.6° E	36 km
Q	43.9° N	118.6° E	33 km
R	46.0° N	117.7° E	49 km
