= Leon Campbell =

Leon Campbell may refer to:

- Leon Campbell (astronomer)
- Leon Campbell (American football)
