= Van Maanen (crater) =

Crater on the Moon

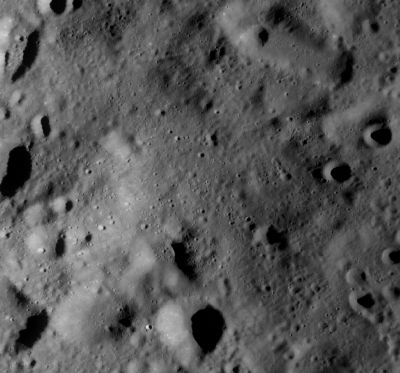
- LRO WAC mosaic
- Coordinates: 35.7°N 128.0°E
- Diameter: 60 km
- Depth: Unknown
- Colongitude: 232° at sunrise
- Eponym: Adriaan van Maanen

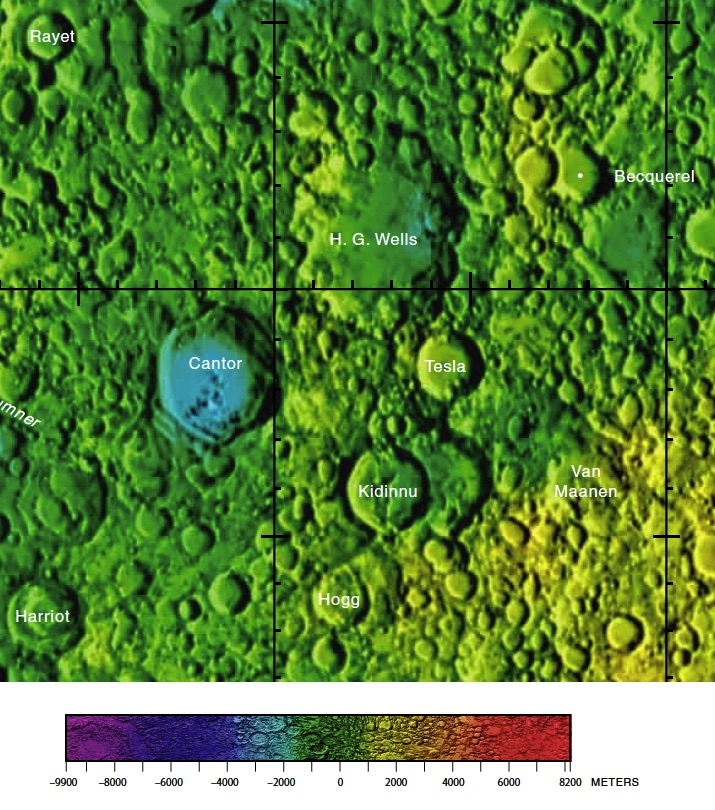

Van Maanen is a heavily degraded lunar impact crater on the far side of the Moon. It lies to the east of the crater Kidinnu, and southeast of Tesla and H. G. Wells. Since this crater was formed, it has been heavily battered by subsequent impacts to the point where it is little more than a depression in the surface surrounded by an irregular rim. The rim edge is heavily worn and poorly defined, with smaller craters lying along the sides. These in turn have become worn and rounded.

== Satellite craters ==
By convention these features are identified on lunar maps by placing the letter on the side of the crater midpoint that is closest to Van Maanen.

Van Maanen	Latitude	Longitude	Diameter
K	33.2° N	129.1° E	23 km

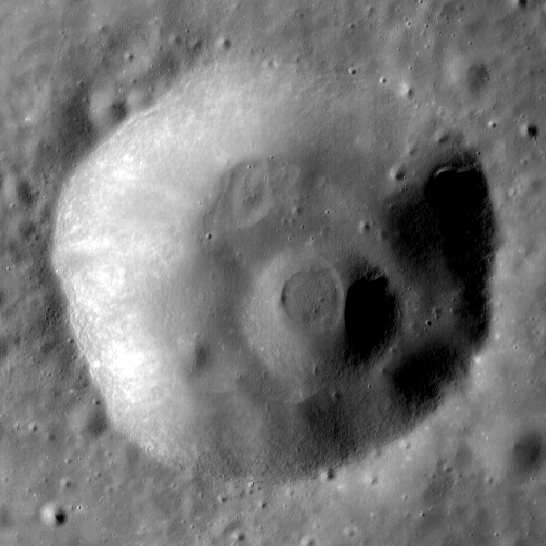
Van Maanen K
