= Kurchatov (crater) =

Crater on the Moon

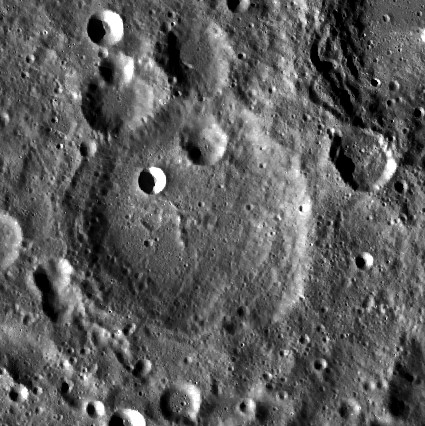
- LRO WAC image
- Coordinates: 38.30°N 141.74°E
- Diameter: 110.96 km (68.95 mi)
- Depth: Unknown
- Colongitude: 218° at sunrise
- Eponym: Igor V. Kurchatov

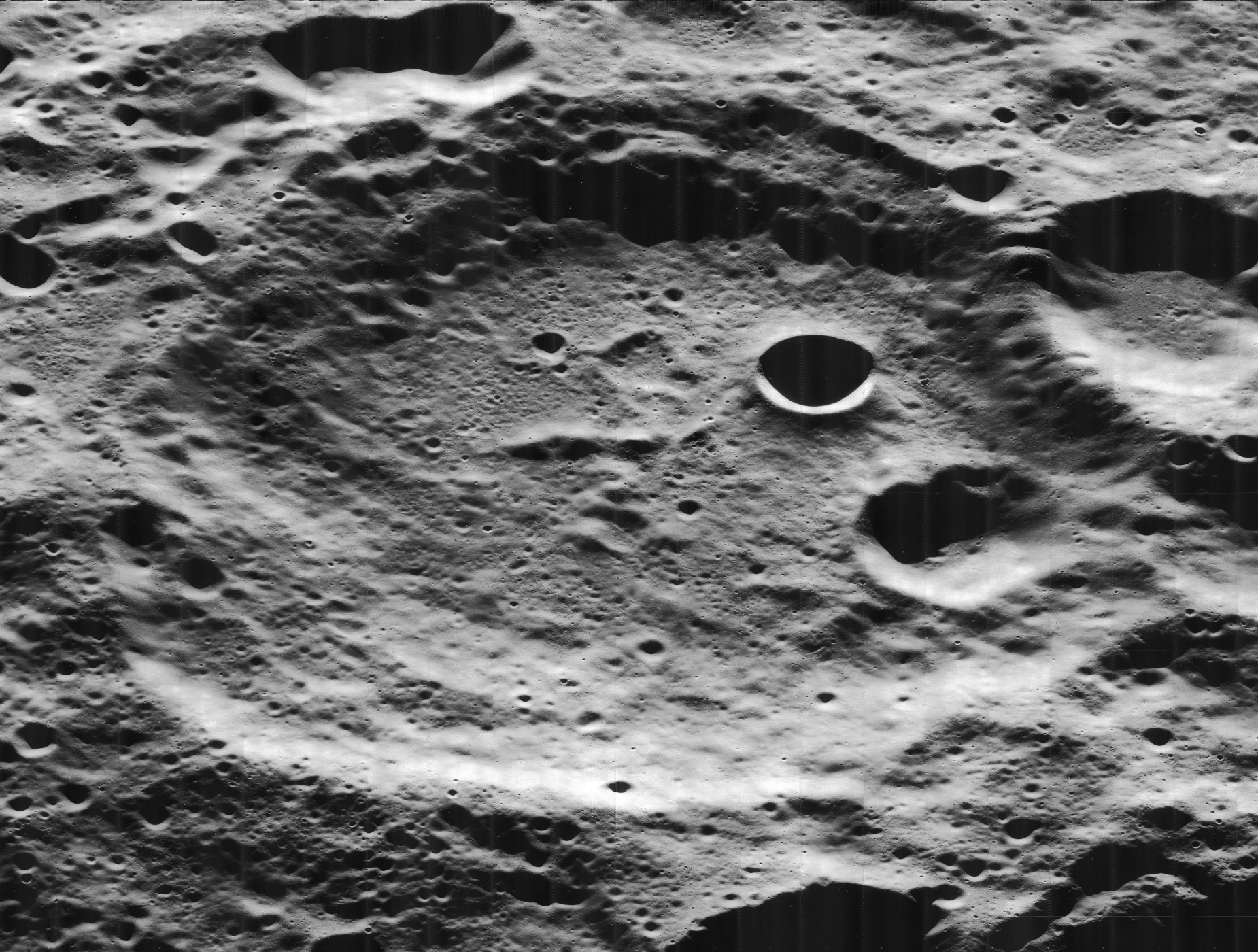
Oblique Lunar Orbiter 5 image

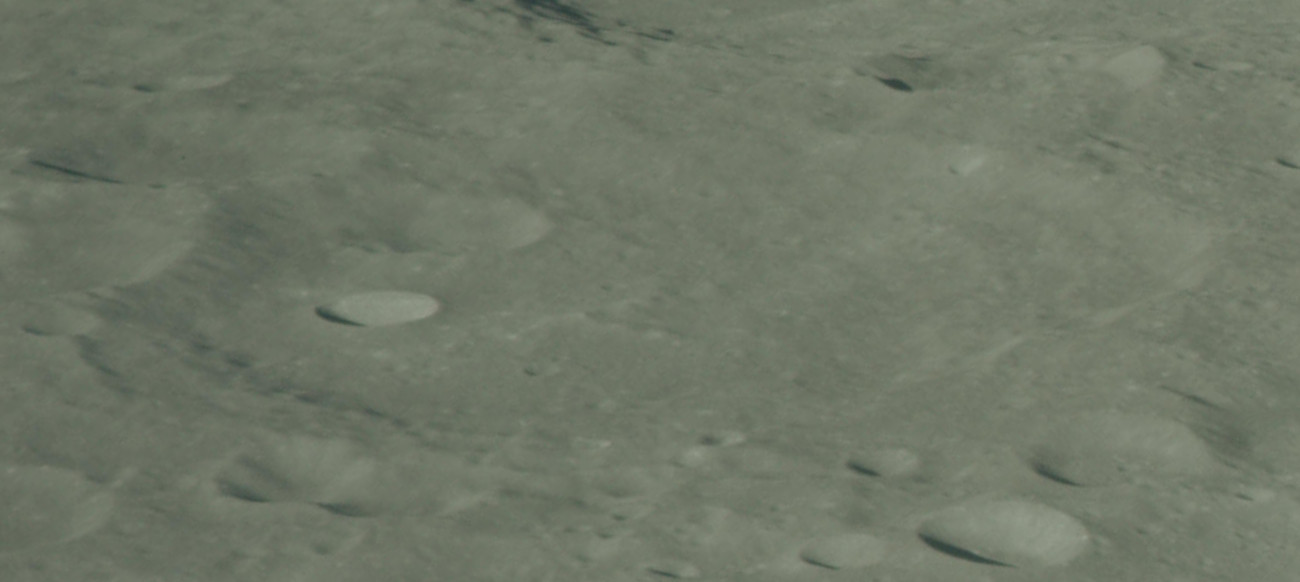
Oblique Apollo 13 image

Kurchatov is a lunar impact crater that is located on the Moon's far side. It is just to the southwest of the crater Wiener, and farther to the southeast of Bridgman. A couple of crater diameters to the south of Kurchatov is the northern edge of the Mare Moscoviense.

This is a worn and eroded crater formation, with a pair of small craters lying across the northern rim, and a generally worn and pitted rim and inner wall. A small crater lies along the northern inner wall and a bowl-shaped crater at the northwest edge of the interior floor. There is a small, elongated central ridge near the midpoint, and the interior floor is pitted with tiny craterlets. The infrared spectrum of pure crystalline plagioclase has been identified on the crater floor.

Beginning to the south of Kurchatov and running toward the west-northwest is a crater chain designated Catena Kurchatov. The chain ends to the southeast of Becquerel. The trend of the chain points back toward Mare Orientale and it may be secondary craters from that impact.

Prior to formal naming by the IAU in 1961, Kurchatov was called Crater 126.

== Satellite craters ==
By convention these features are identified on lunar maps by placing the letter on the side of the crater midpoint that is closest to Kurchatov.

Kurchatov	Latitude	Longitude	Diameter
T	38.0° N	138.0° E	27 km
W	40.4° N	140.4° E	33 km
X	41.3° N	139.9° E	17 km
Z	41.0° N	141.8° E	27 km
