= Golovin (crater) =

Crater on the Moon

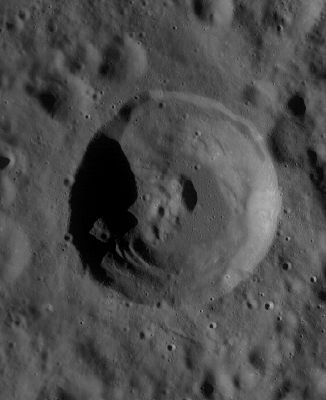
- LRO image
- Coordinates: 39.75°N 161.24°E
- Diameter: 37.86 km (23.53 mi)
- Depth: Unknown
- Colongitude: 199° at sunrise
- Eponym: Nicholas E. Golovin

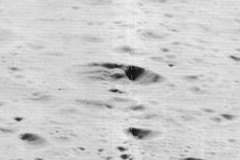
Oblique Lunar Orbiter 5 image, facing west

Golovin is a lunar impact crater that is located to the southeast of Campbell, a walled plain. It lies in the northern hemisphere on the Moon's far side, and cannot be seen directly from the Earth. Just two crater diameters to the southwest of Golovin is the larger crater Appleton, and to the north is Langevin.

The nearly circular rim of Golovin is not markedly eroded, and is not overlaid by any impacts of note. There is a slight outward bulge to the northwest. The inner walls are relatively wide, and have slumped slightly near the top edge. There is a formation of central ridges at the midpoint of the interior. The interior floor is otherwise small and relatively level.

The crater is named after American rocketry scientist Nicholas Erasmus Golovin. Golovin worked briefly for NASA, and for President John F. Kennedy's and Lyndon B. Johnson's Science Advisory Committee. He was notable for helping Jerome Wiesner challenge NASA's decision to use lunar orbit rendezvous in the Apollo program. Its designation was approved by the International Astronomical Union in 1970.

== Satellite craters ==
By convention these features are identified on lunar maps by placing the letter on the side of the crater midpoint that is closest to Golovin.

Golovin	Latitude	Longitude	Diameter
C	40.8° N	163.1° E	16 km
