= Pawsey (crater) =

Crater on the Moon

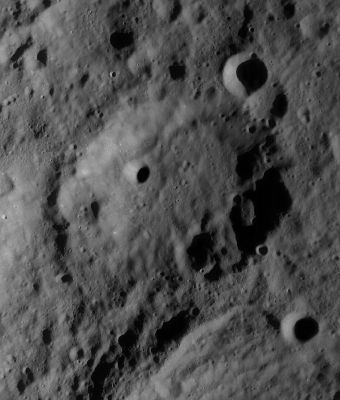
- LRO WAC image
- Coordinates: 44.24°N 145.29°E
- Diameter: 59.98 km (37.27 mi)
- Depth: Unknown
- Colongitude: 216° at sunrise
- Eponym: Joseph Lade Pawsey

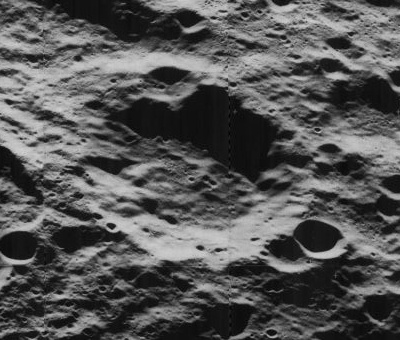
Oblique view from Lunar Orbiter 5, facing west

Pawsey is a worn impact crater that lies next to the northern outer ramparts of the crater Wiener, on the far side of the Moon. To the east-northeast of Pawsey is the large crater Campbell, and farther to the west is Bridgman.

This crater is partly overlain by the ejecta from the younger Wiener impact, leaving an uneven formation with edges that have been blanketed by material. There is a small crater along the western rim, and another small, cup-shaped crater along the northeastern edge. Within the interior is a small, cup-shaped craterlet along the base of western inner wall.

It was named in honour of the Australian radiophysicist and radio astronomer Joseph Pawsey. Prior to formal naming by the IAU in 1970, Pawsey was called Crater 55.
