= Tesla (crater) =

Lunar crater

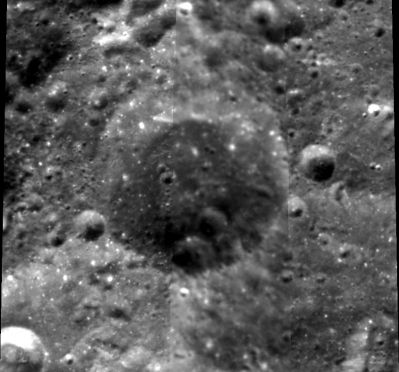
- Clementine mosaic
- Coordinates: 38.5°N 124.7°E
- Diameter: 43 km
- Depth: unknown
- Colongitude: 235° at sunrise
- Eponym: Nikola Tesla

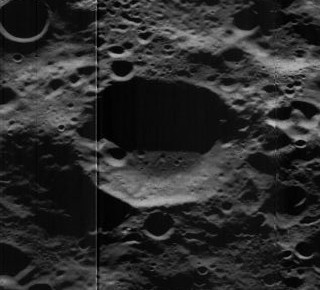
Oblique Lunar Orbiter 5 image, facing west

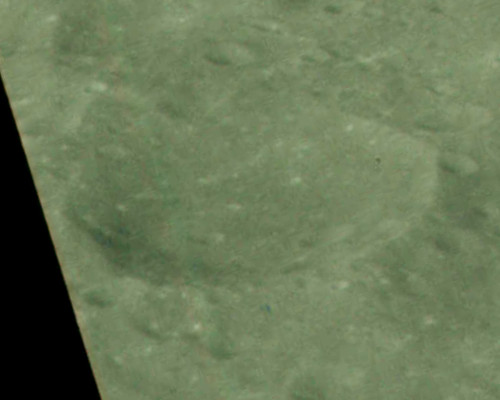
View from Apollo 13

Tesla is a lunar impact crater that is located on the Moon's far side, just to the southeast of the larger H. G. Wells. About one crater diameter to the southwest of Tesla is Kidinnu, and to the southeast is Van Maanen. The crater is named after Serbian-American inventor Nikola Tesla.

Tesla is a circular, bowl-shaped feature. There are a pair of small craterlets in the southern inner wall, but the crater is otherwise free of overlapping craters of significance. Only a few tiny impacts mark the floor and remaining sides.

== Satellite craters ==
By convention these features are identified on lunar maps by placing the letter on the side of the crater midpoint that is closest to Tesla.

Tesla	Latitude	Longitude	Diameter
J	37.2° N	126.7° E	18 km

== See also ==
- 2244 Tesla, minor planet
