= Ley (crater) =

Crater on the Moon

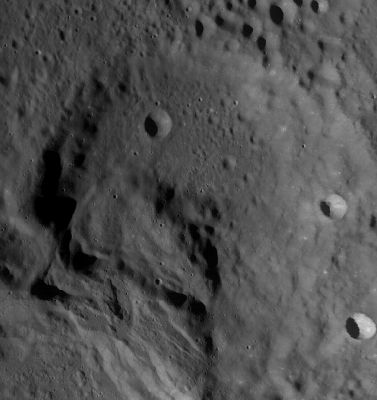
- Ley Crater on the far side of the Moon, named for science writer Willy Ley. LRO WAC image
- Coordinates: 42.11°N 154.84°E
- Diameter: 81.05 km (50.36 mi)
- Depth: Unknown
- Colongitude: 205° at sunrise
- Eponym: Willy Ley

Ley is a lunar impact crater on the far side of the Moon. It is named in honor of the German-American science writer Willy Ley and is located across the southern rim of the much larger Campbell, a walled plain. Intruding into the south-southwestern rim of Ley is the slightly larger crater Von Neumann. The debris from the formation of Von Neumann has produced a bulging rampart that occupies the southwest interior floor of Ley. The outer rim of Ley has undergone impact erosion, and is marked by a number of small craters. The inner wall is also worn, and the interior floor is pock-marked by a number of small craters. There is a small, cup-shaped crater on the floor to the northwest of the midpoint.

Prior to formal naming by the IAU in 1970, Ley was called Crater 59.
