= Shorshely =

Coordinates: 56°00′N 47°35′E

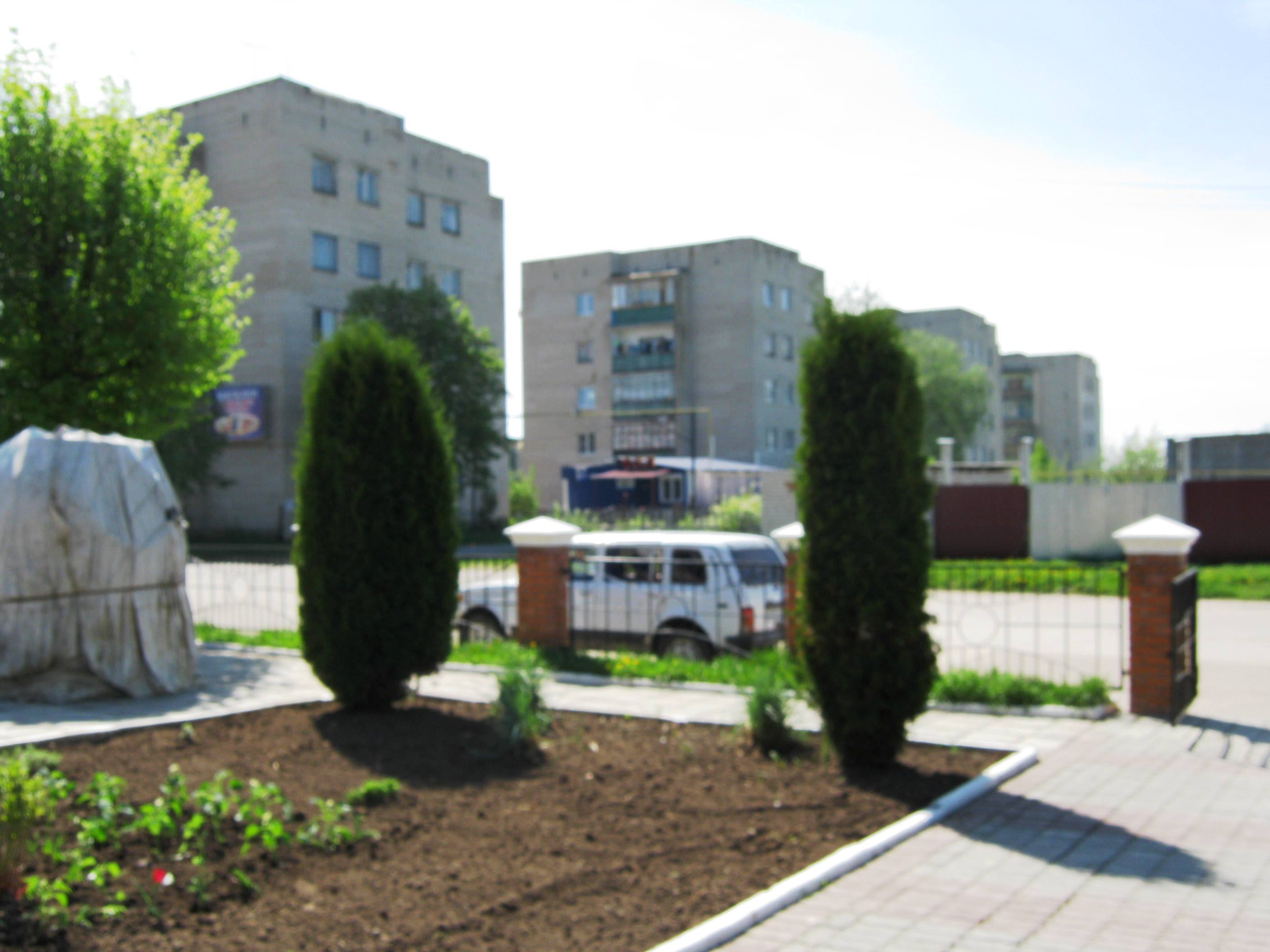
Shorshely.

Shorshely (Russian: Шоршелы; Chuvash: Шуршăл, Şurşăl) is a town in Chuvashia, Russia. It is situated between Anatkasy and Yerdovo, and nearby to Atlashevo and Yel’nikovo. It is on the Volga River.

The village was the birthplace of early Soviet cosmonaut Andriyan Nikolayev. It has a museum of Space exploration, and is the site of his interment.

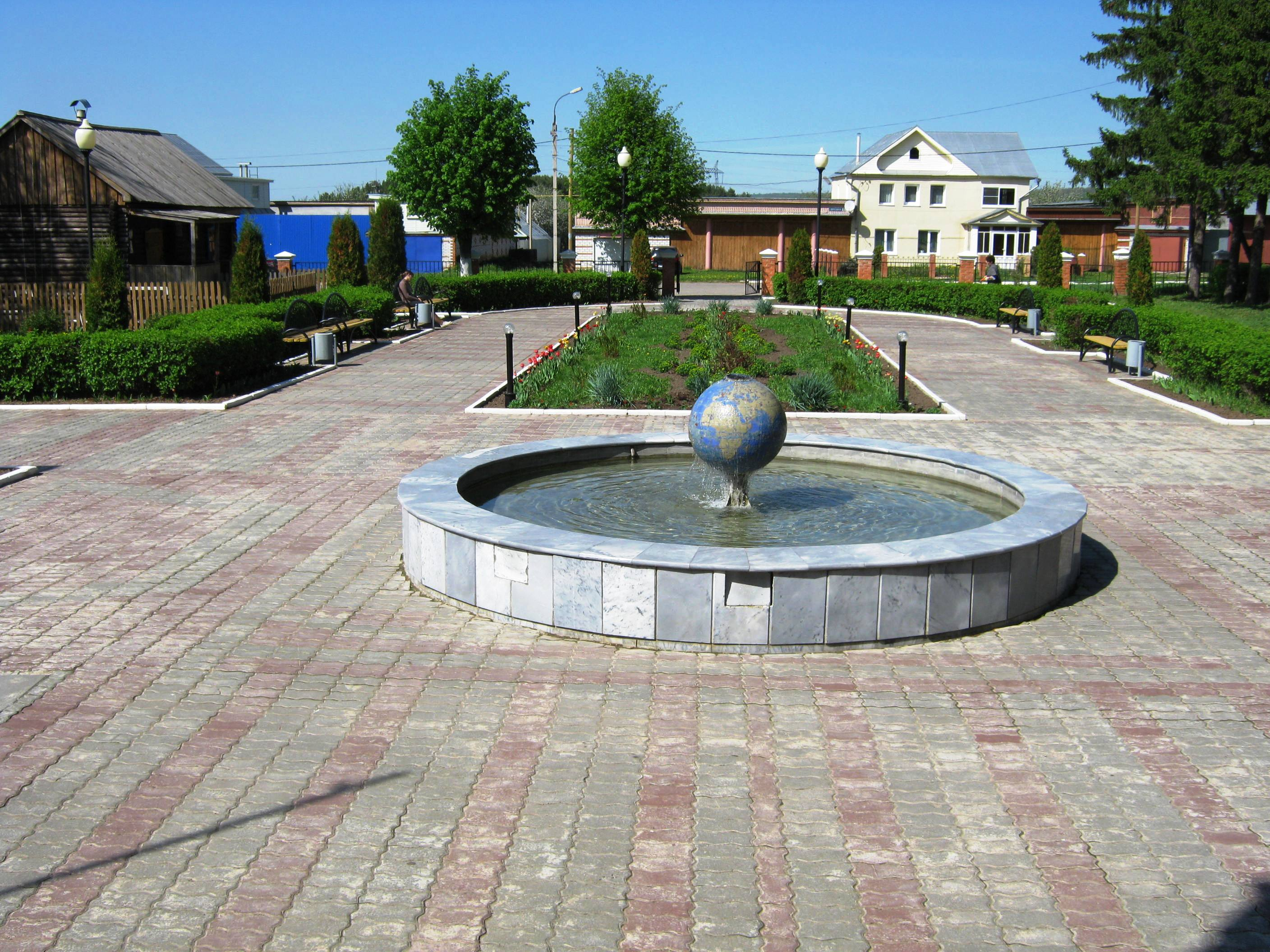
Shorshely Square
