= Nikolaev (crater) =

Crater on the Moon

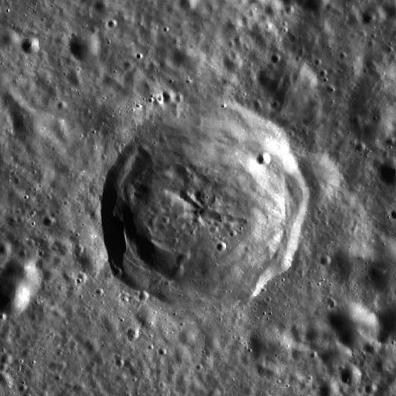
- LRO WAC image
- Coordinates: 35.2°N 151.3°E
- Diameter: 41 km
- Depth: Unknown
- Colongitude: 210° at sunrise
- Eponym: Andriyan Grigoryevich Nikolaev

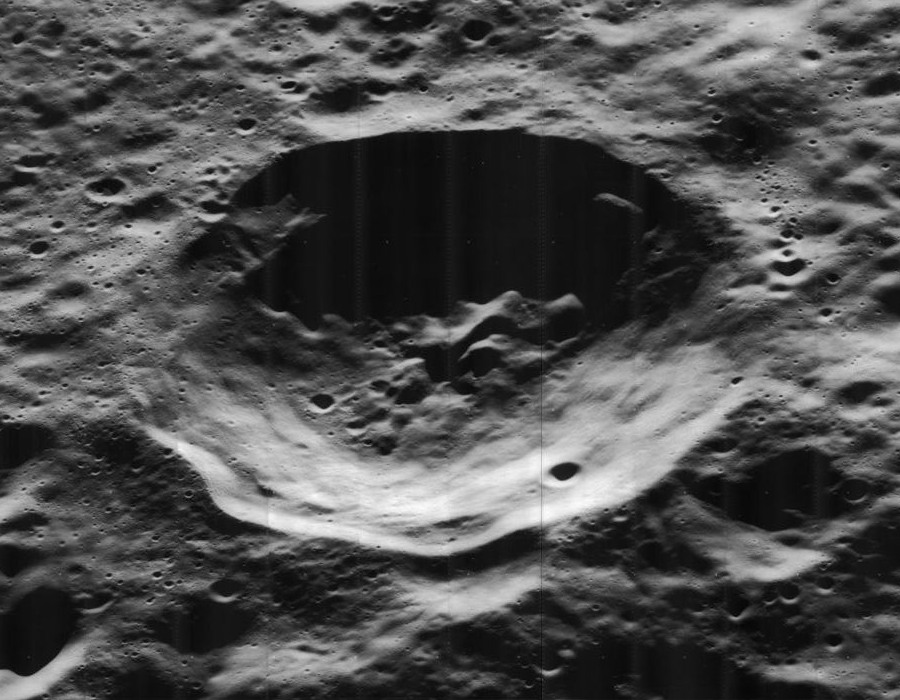
Oblique Lunar Orbiter 5 image

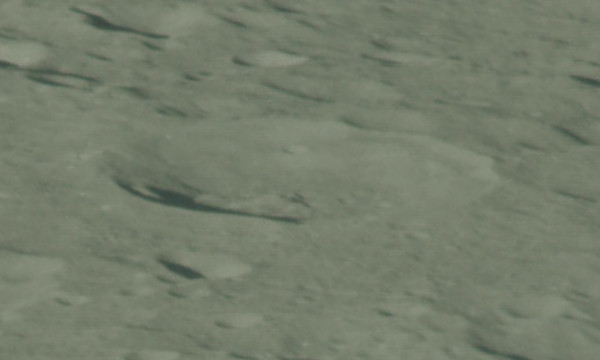
Oblique Apollo 13 image

Nikolaev is a crater on the far side of the Moon. It is located north of the Mare Moscoviense and south of the larger crater Von Neumann. Because it is on the far side of the Moon, it is not visible from Earth. It is named after the Soviet cosmonaut, Andriyan Nikolaev.

The circular rim of this crater is not overlain by any significant craters but has been slightly eroded. It has an uneven edge and a wide inner wall. There is a shelf running around much of the wide inner edge where the material has slumped, and some terracing along the northeastern side. The interior floor is rugged in places, particularly in the eastern half, and is marked by several small impacts in the southern half. There is a small central rise near the midpoint.
