= Andriyan Nikolayev =

Soviet cosmonaut (1929–2004)

- Андриян Николаев
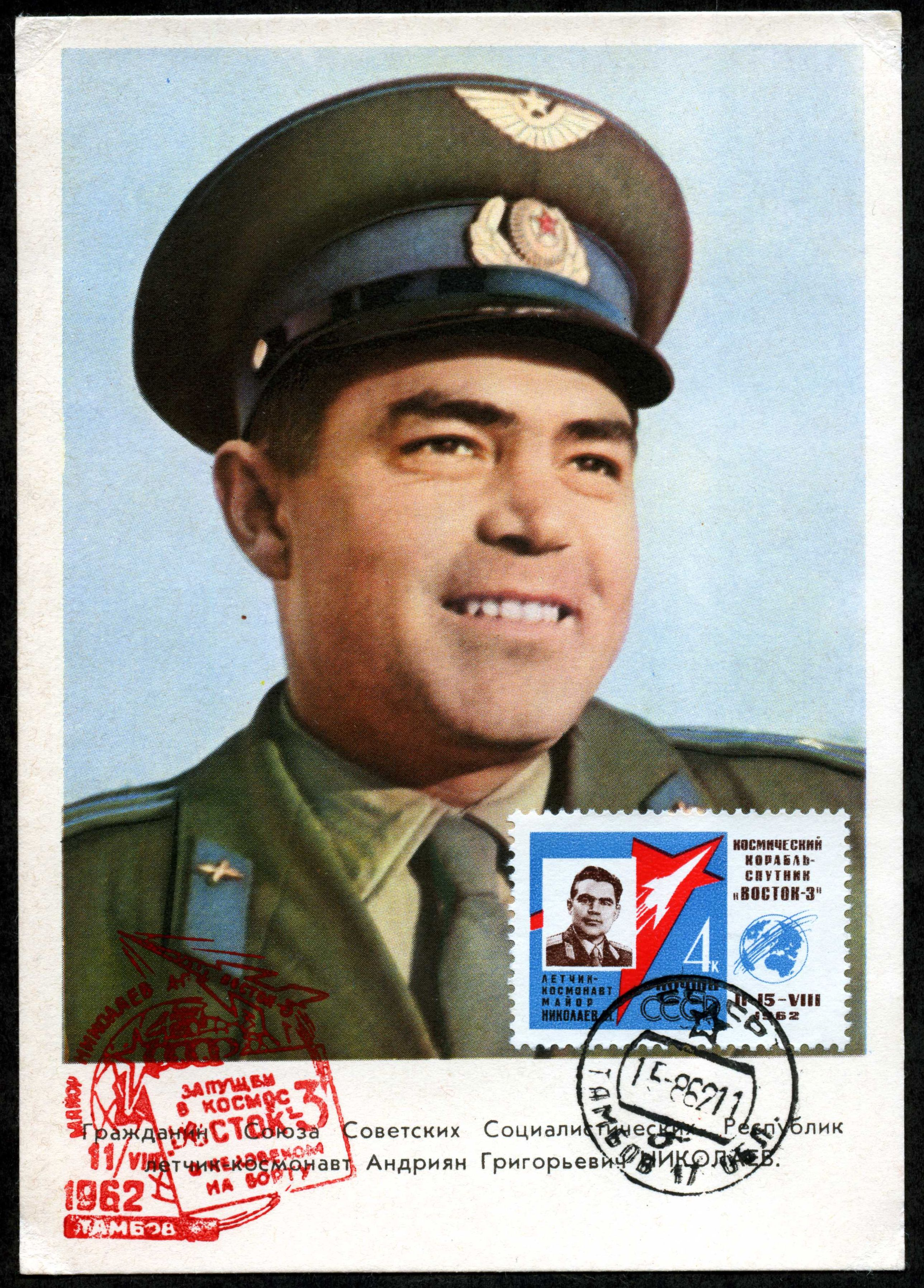
- Nikolayev on a 1962 Soviet envelope
- Born: 5 September 1929; Shorshely, Russian SFSR, Soviet Union (now Russia)
- Died: 3 July 2004 (aged 74); Cheboksary, Chuvashia, Russia
- Occupation: Pilot
- Spouse: Valentina Tereshkova (m. 1963; div. 1982)
- Children: 1
- Space career

Cosmonaut
- Rank: Major General, Soviet Air Force (1954–1982)
- Time in space: 21d 15h 20m
- Selection: Air Force Group 1
- Missions: Vostok 3, Soyuz 9

Signature
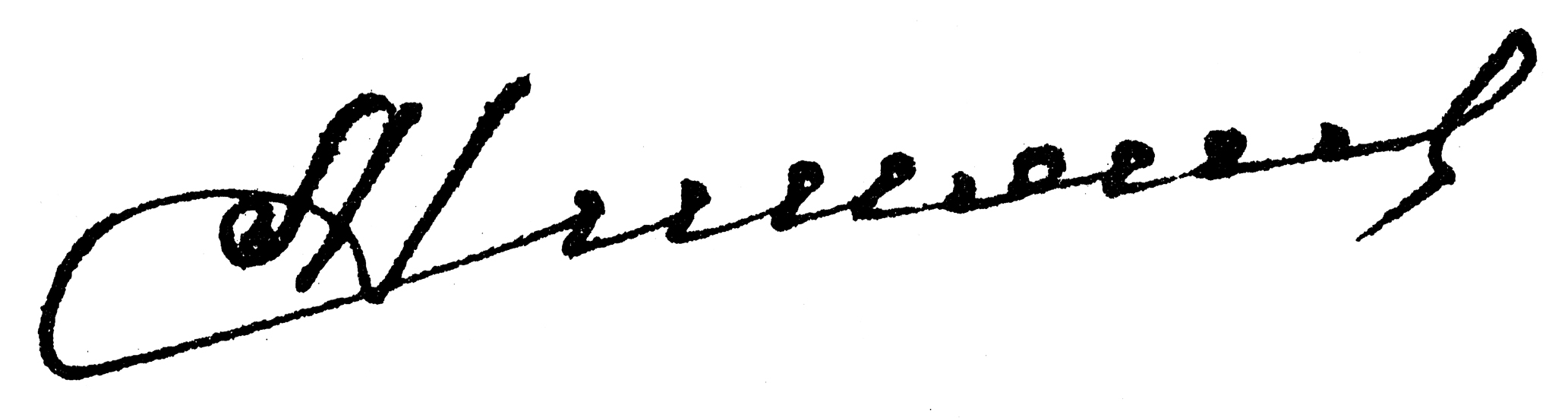

Andriyan Grigoryevich Nikolayev (Chuvash and Russian: Андриян Григорьевич Николаев; 5 September 1929 – 3 July 2004) was a Soviet cosmonaut. In 1962, aboard Vostok 3, he became the third Soviet cosmonaut to fly into space. Nikolayev was an ethnic Chuvash and because of it is considered the first Turkic cosmonaut.

== Early life ==
Andrian Grigoryevich Nikolayev was born on 5 September 1929, in Shorshely, a village in the Chuvash region of the Volga River valley, and spent his time growing up on a collective farm.

== Education and career ==
Nikolayev supported his family following the death of his father in 1944, however this was not preferred by his mother, who preferred that he earn an education. Nikolayev later entered medical school before he joined the Soviet army. During his training Nikolayev was able to maintain a very calm state during stressful situations. Nikolayev's calm made him a fair candidate for becoming a cosmonaut. His future colleagues Yuri Gagarin, Gherman Titov, and seventeen others joined him in March 1960. Nikolayev's future wife was cosmonaut Valentina Tereshkova, and he reportedly kissed her goodbye before boarding Vostok 3.

== History ==
Nikolayev flew on two space flights: Vostok 3 (becoming the third Soviet cosmonaut) and Soyuz 9. His call sign in these flights was Falcon (Russian: Со́кол). On both, he set new endurance records for the longest time a human being had remained in orbit. He also served as backup for the Vostok 2 and Soyuz 8 missions. On 22 January 1969, Nikolayev survived an assassination attempt on Leonid Brezhnev, undertaken by a Soviet Army deserter, Viktor Ilyin. He left the cosmonaut corps on 26 January 1982.

Nikolayev was also the first person to make a television broadcast from space, in August 1962. Vostok 3 was part the first dual space flight, with Pavel Popovich on Vostok 4.

In the early days of space travel, it was usual to place trainee cosmonauts into isolation chambers to see how long they could last alone. They sat in silence unable to gauge time. Many men cracked but Nikolayev lasted the longest – four days – and became known as the Iron Man.

On 3 November 1963, he married Valentina Tereshkova, the first woman to fly in space (see Vostok 6). They had one daughter, Elena Andriyanovna (now a doctor of medicine), before their marriage collapsed. However, it was not until 1982 that they divorced.

In 2004, Nikolayev died of a heart attack in Cheboksary, the capital of Chuvashia in Russia. A scandal ensued. His daughter, who lives in Moscow, desired that he be interred in the cemetery at Star City. The President of Chuvashia had other ideas. After a farewell ceremony in Cheboksary, Nikolayev was buried in his native village of Shorshely. He has no family living in the republic. Plans are in the works to move the body to Star City.

Nikolayev was also a keen skier:

Service in the Air Force made us strong, both physically and morally. All of us cosmonauts took up sports and PT seriously when we served in the Air Force. I know that Yuri Gagarin was fond of ice hockey. He liked to play goal keeper. Gherman Titov was a gymnastics enthusiast, Andriyan Nikolayev liked skiing, Pavel Popovich went in for weight lifting. I don't think I am wrong when I say that sports became a fixture in the life of the cosmonauts.

== Awards ==
- Hero of the Soviet Union, twice (18 August 1962, 3 July 1970)
- Order of Lenin (18 August 1962)
- Order of the Red Banner of Labour (15 January 1976)
- Order of the Red Star (1961)
- Order "For Service to the Homeland in the Armed Forces of the USSR", 3rd class (30 May 1988)
- Medal "For Strengthening of Brotherhood in Arms" (18 February 1991)
- USSR State Prize (1981)
- Pilot-Cosmonaut of the USSR
- Hero of the Mongolian People's Republic
- Hero of Labour of Mongolia (1965)
- Order of Sukhbaatar (1965, Mongolia)
- Hero of Socialist Labour (Bulgaria)
- Order of Georgi Dimitrov (Bulgaria)
- Order of Cyril and Methodius (Bulgaria)
- Hero of Socialist Labour (Vietnam, 1962)
- Order "State Banner IRR" (Hungary, 1964)
- National Order of Nepal (1963)
- Star of the Republic of Indonesia, 2nd class (1963)
- Order of the Nile (Egypt)
- Honorary Citizen of the Chuvash Republic, Petrozavodsk (1980), Karaganda and Smolensk
- Honoured Master of Sports of the USSR (1962)

The lunar crater Nikolaev is named after him.

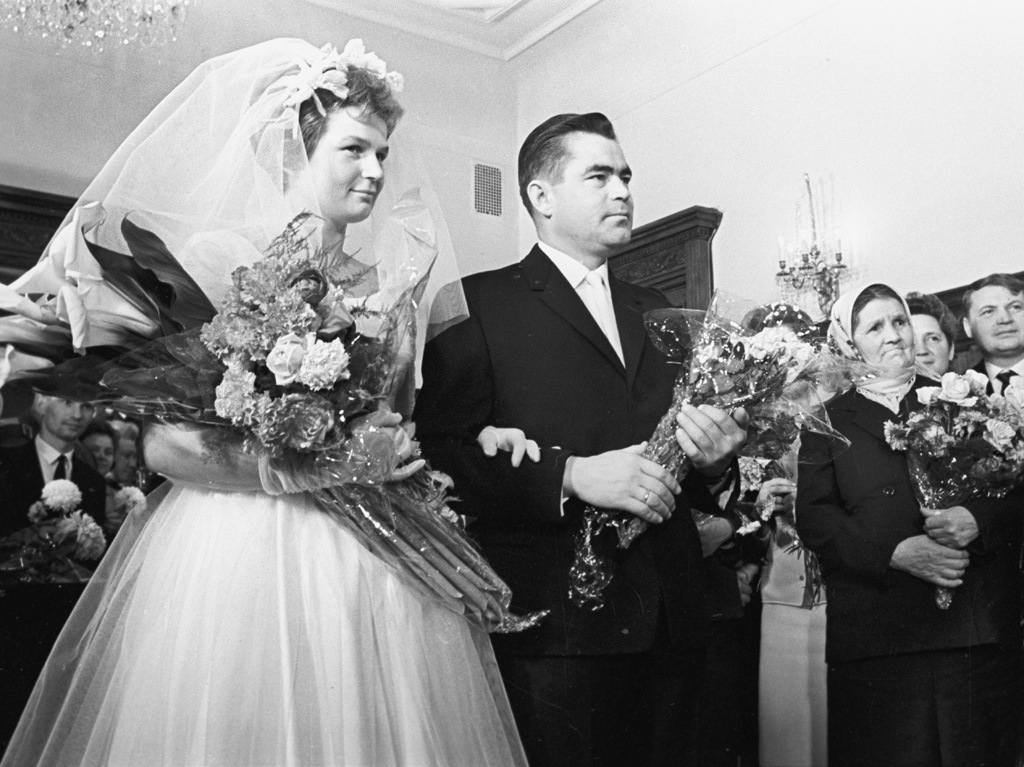
Wedding of Tereshkova and Nikolayev in 1963

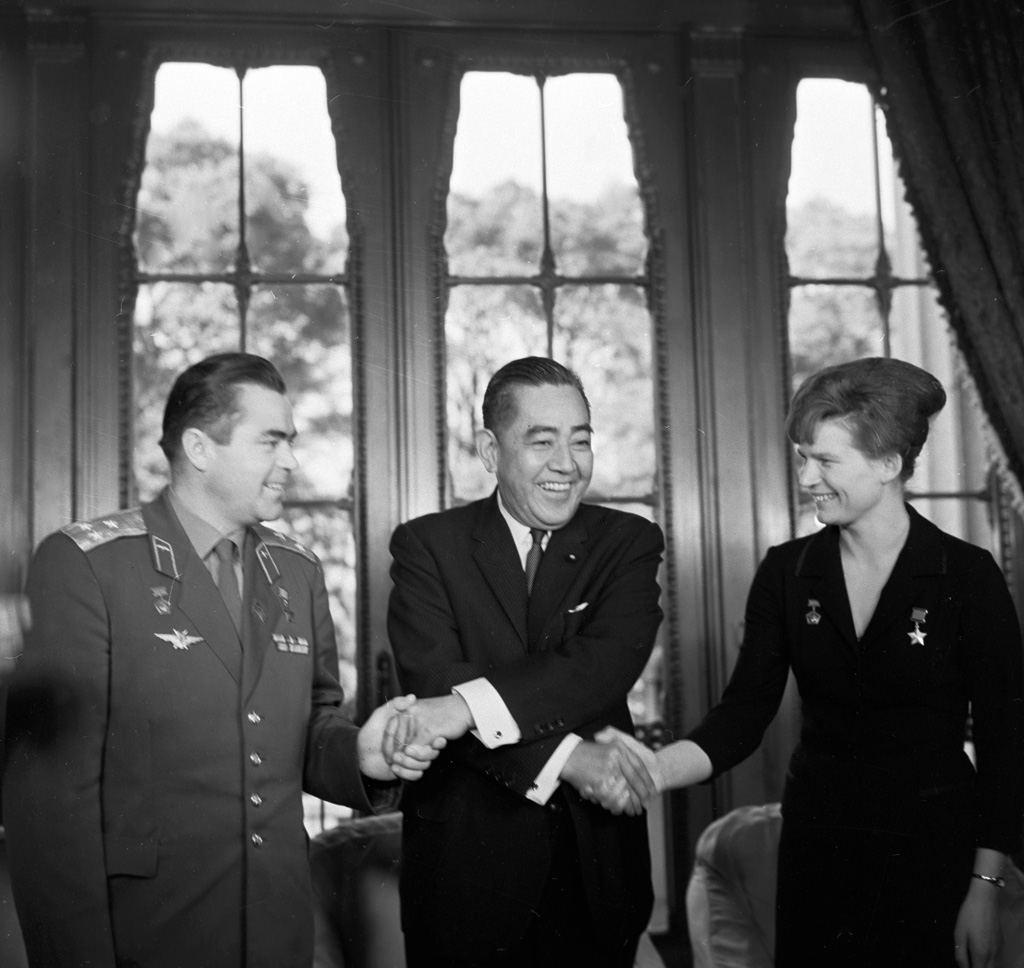
Tereshkova and Nikolayev with Japanese prime minister Eisaku Satō in 1965

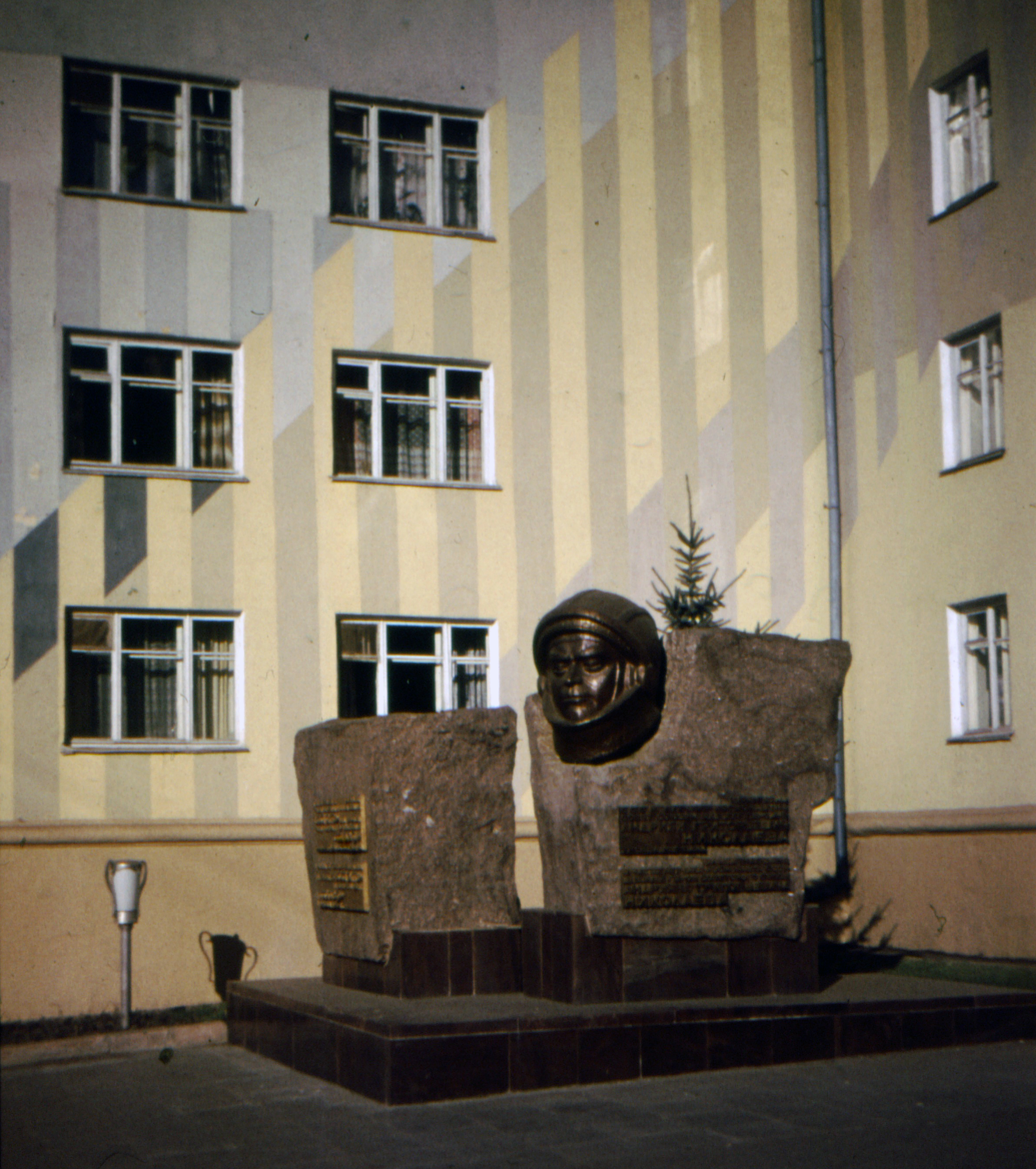
Monument to Andriyan Nikolayev in Cheboksary

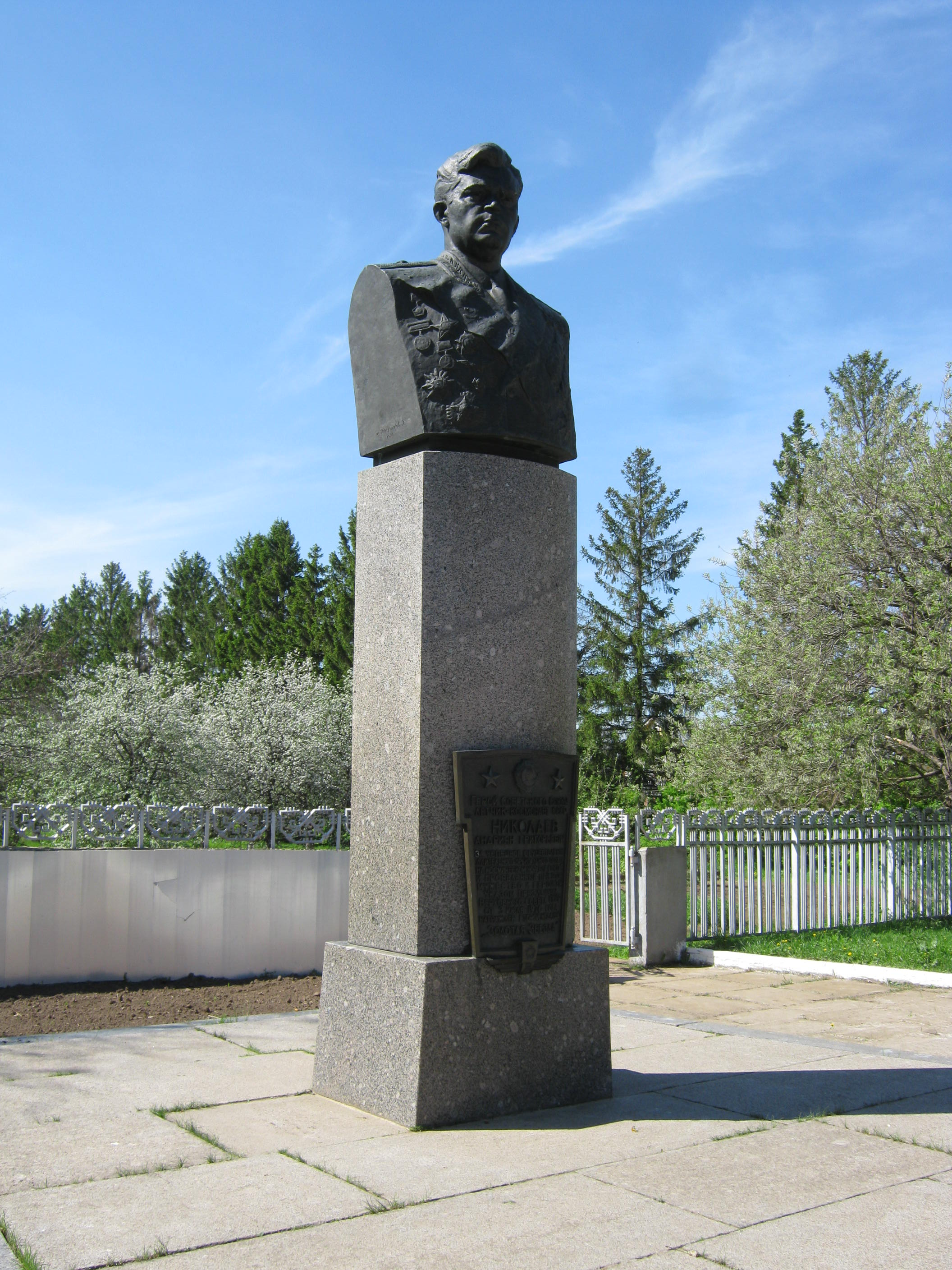
Nikolayev Monument in Shorshely

== See also ==
- Attempted assassination of Leonid Brezhnev
