= Wiener (crater) =

Crater on the Moon

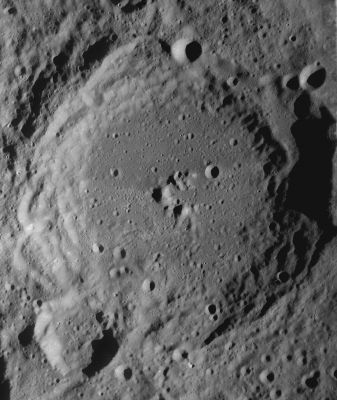
- LRO WAC image
- Coordinates: 40.90°N 146.51°E
- Diameter: 113.39 km (70.46 mi)
- Depth: Unknown
- Colongitude: 215° at sunrise
- Eponym: Norbert Wiener

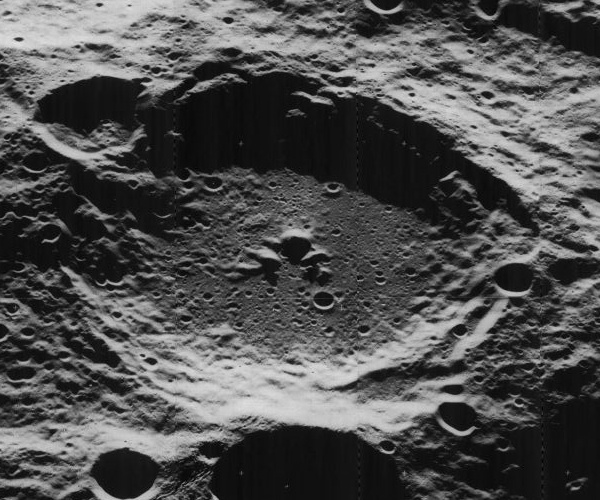
Oblique view from Lunar Orbiter 5, facing west

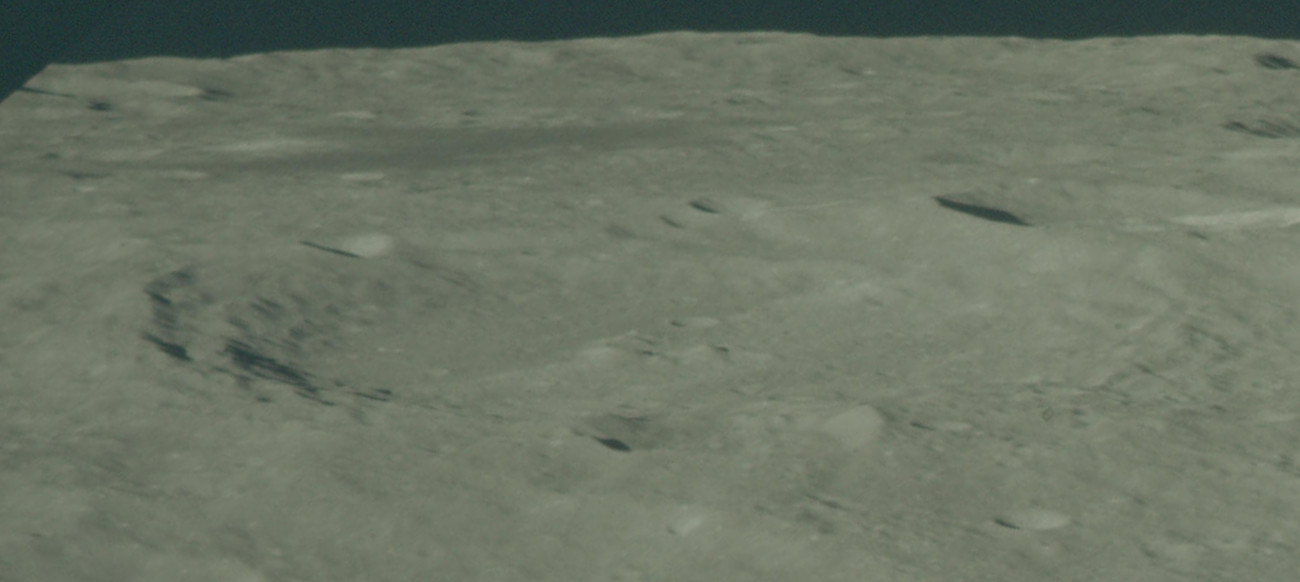
Oblique Apollo 13 image

Wiener is a lunar impact crater that lies on the Moon's far side. It is located just to the southwest of the larger crater Campbell. To the southwest of Wiener is the heavily worn Kurchatov. To the east along the rim of Campbell is Von Neumann. The smaller crater Pawsey lies to the north-northwest, and is partly overlain by the outer rampart of Wiener.

This formation dates to the Nectarian epoch of the lunar geologic timescale. The northwestern half of the crater rim is well-formed, with some slumping and terraces along the inner walls. There is an outward protrusion in the rim along the northern side where the crater borders along Pawsey. The southern part of the crater is more irregular, with a wider, uneven inner wall and a poorly defined rim edge. The rim overlies about half of the heavily worn satellite crater Wiener K along the south-southeast. The smaller satellite crater Wiener Q lies along the southwestern rim, and the relatively fresh and polygon-shaped Wiener F is just east of the eastern rim.

Within the crater, much of the interior floor is relatively level, with a clump of small ridges forming a central peak structure near the midpoint. There is a small crater to the east-northeast of these ridges, and there are several small craters near the southwestern inner wall.

Prior to formal naming by the IAU in 1970, Wiener was called Crater 56.

== Satellite craters ==
By convention these features are identified on lunar maps by placing the letter on the side of the crater midpoint that is closest to Wiener.

Wiener	Latitude	Longitude	Diameter
F	41.2° N	150.0° E	47 km
H	39.8° N	149.9° E	17 km
K	39.3° N	147.8° E	101 km
Q	39.5° N	145.0° E	30 km

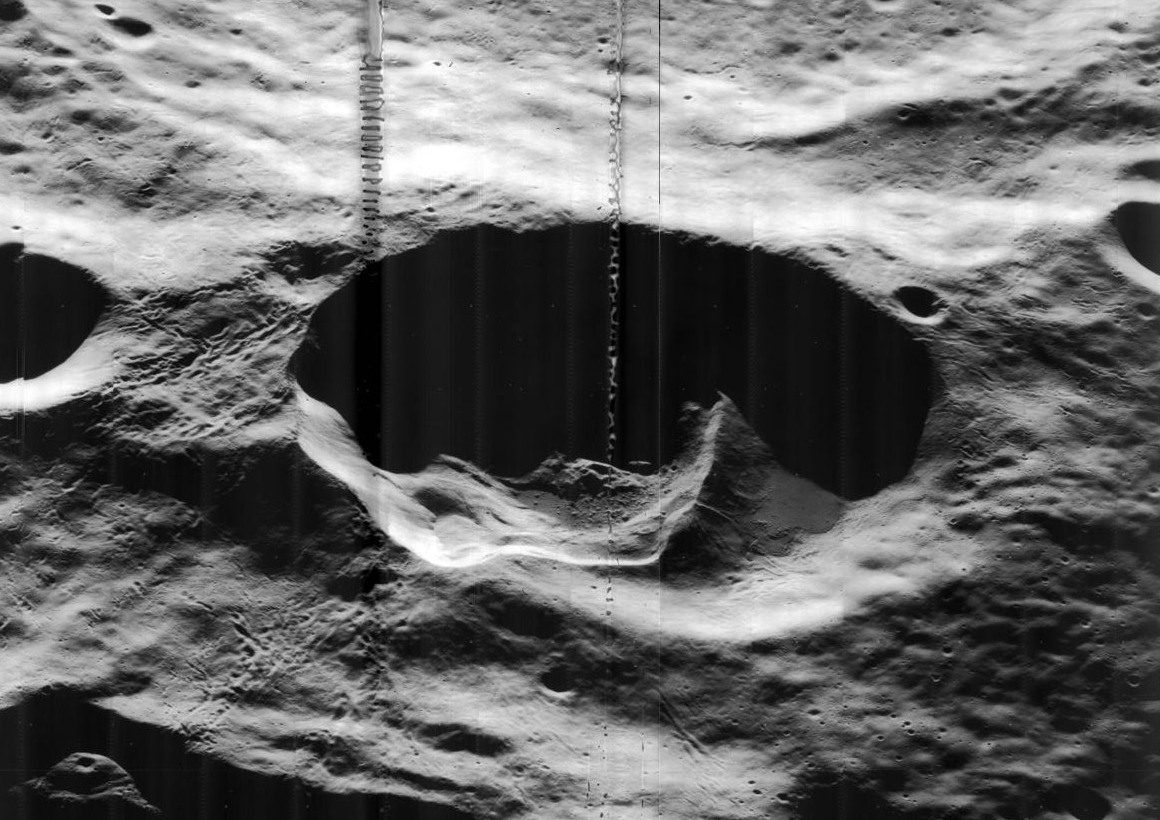
Oblique view of the young crater Wiener F, from Lunar Orbiter 5

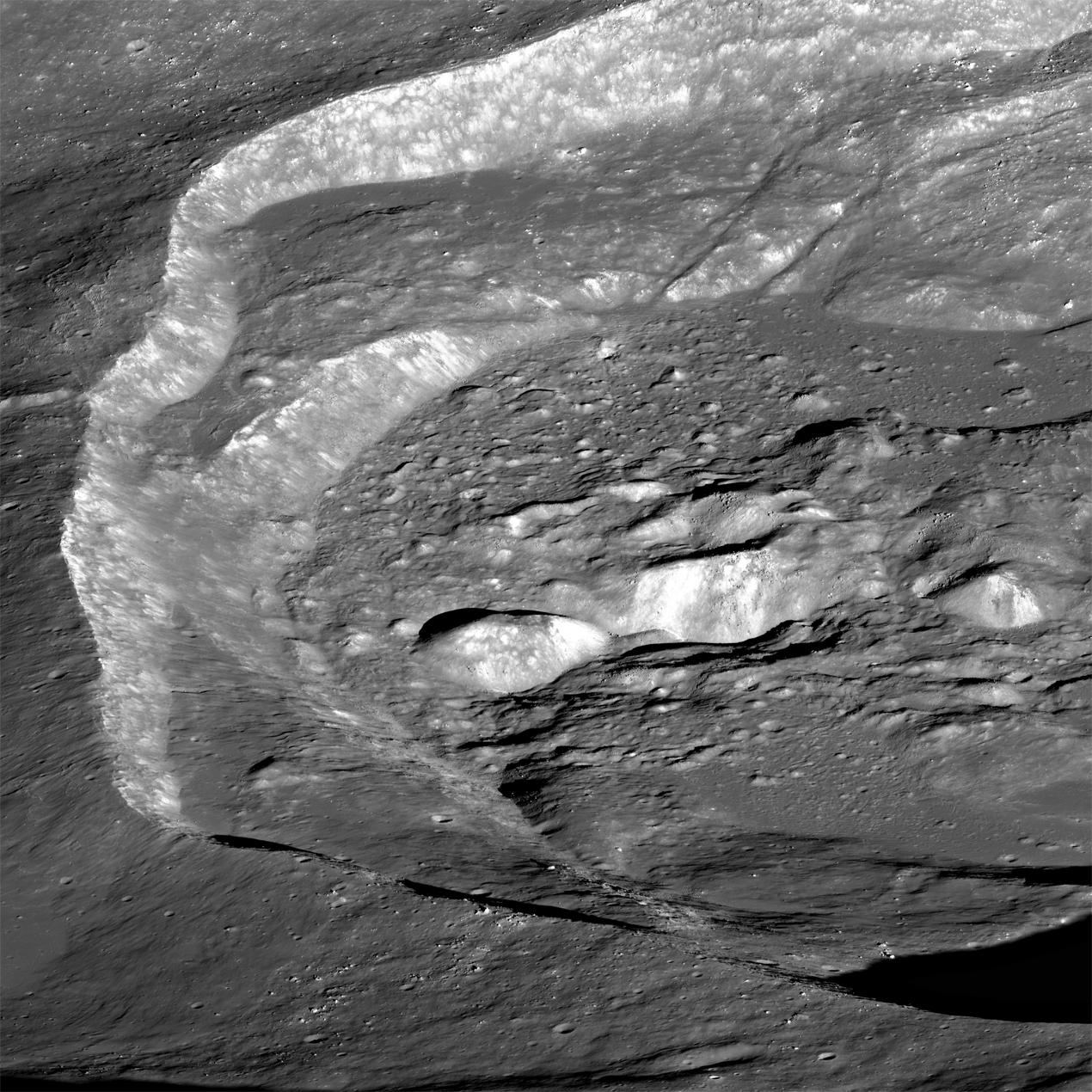
Oblique view of the interior of Wiener F, from LRO
