= Von Neumann (crater) =

Crater on the Moon

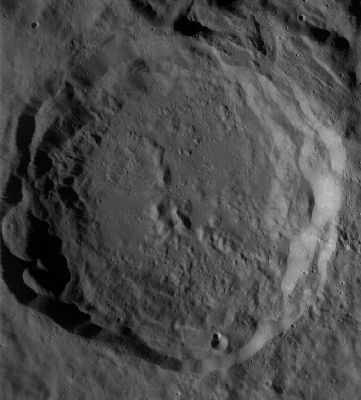
- LRO WAC image
- Coordinates: 40.28°N 153.25°E
- Diameter: 74.83 km (46.50 mi)
- Depth: Unknown
- Colongitude: 209° at sunrise
- Eponym: John von Neumann

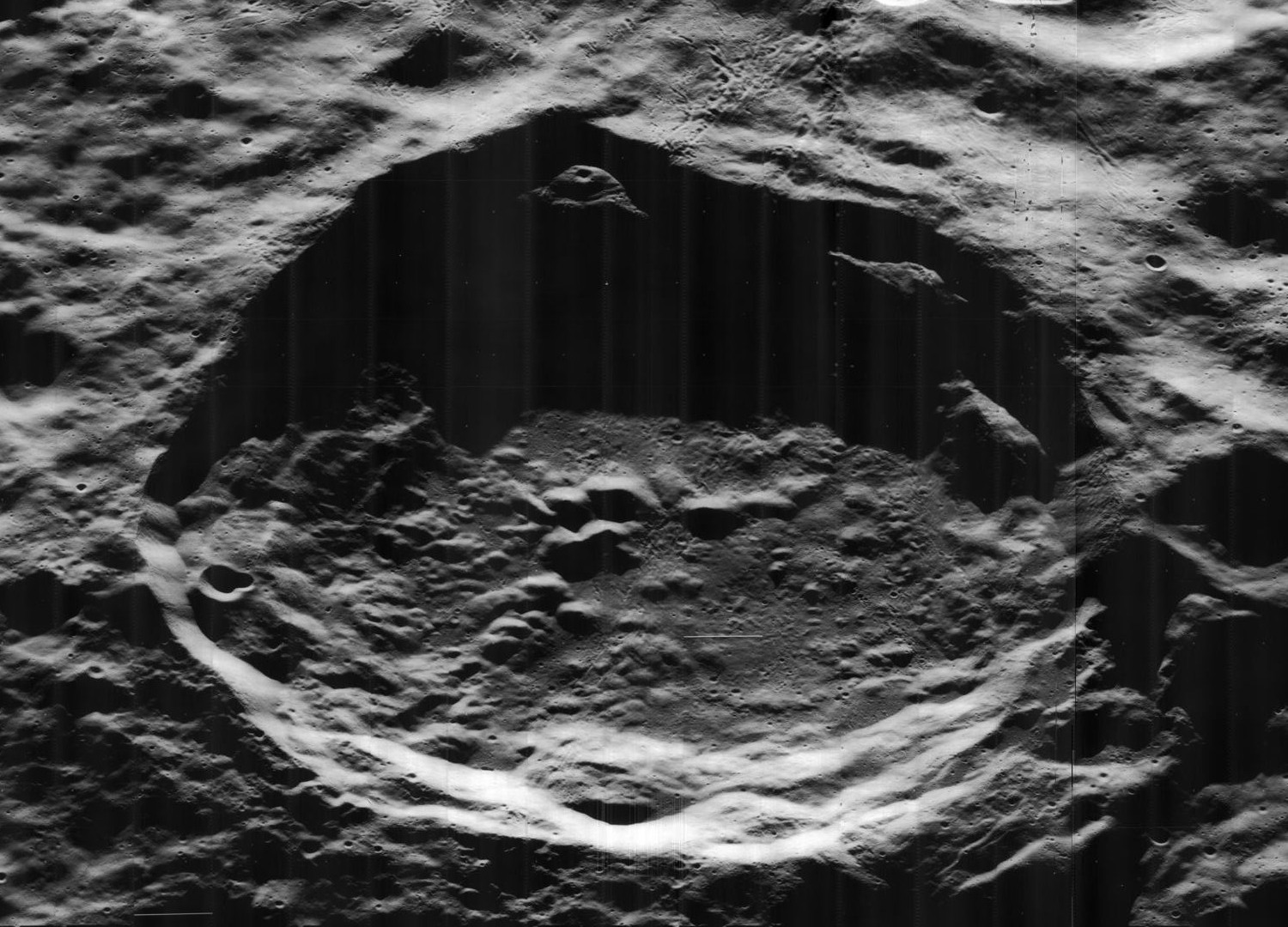
Oblique Lunar Orbiter 5 image

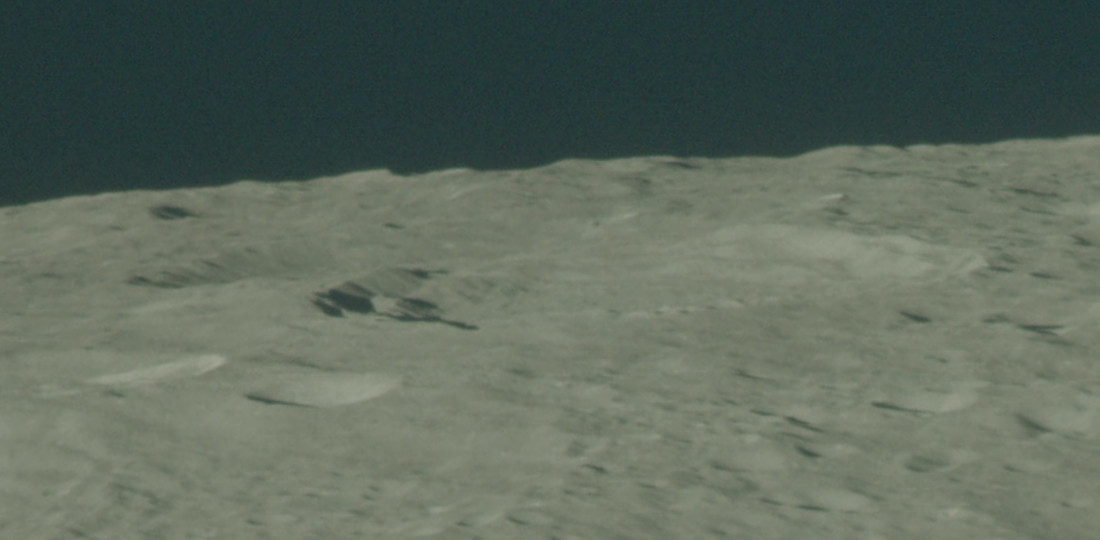
Oblique Apollo 13 image

Von Neumann is a lunar impact crater that lies on the far side of the Moon, in the northern hemisphere, named after polymath John von Neumann. It is nearly attached to the south-southeastern rim of the walled plain named Campbell. The crater Ley is attached to the northeastern rim of Von Neumann, and is somewhat overlain by the outer rampart. To the west is the prominent Wiener, and to the south-southwest is Nikolayev.

This formation dates to the Late Imbrian epoch of the lunar geologic timescale. It has a wide inner wall with multiple terraces. The width of the inner wall varies around the perimeter, with the widest section to the south. There is some slumping along the inner wall to the northwest where the rim makes its closest approach to Campbell, and the narrow terrain between these two craters is rugged and irregular. But the remaining terrain that surrounds the crater is almost equally rugged. The rim appears somewhat straighter along the southwest side, but is roughly circular elsewhere.

The interior floor is nearly flat and level along the western side. There is a small range of ridges running from the south to the northern edge of the floor, and the ground is more irregular in the eastern half. There are no significant impacts within the crater interior and the sides are generally unworn.

Prior to formal naming by the IAU in 1970, Von Neumann was called Crater 58.
