= Kidinnu (crater) =

Crater on the Moon

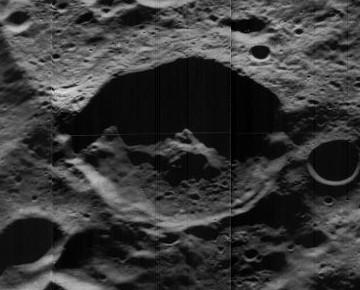
- Oblique Lunar Orbiter 5 image, facing west
- Coordinates: 35.79°N 122.95°E
- Diameter: 55.10 km (34.24 mi)
- Depth: Unknown
- Colongitude: 238° at sunrise
- Eponym: Kidinnu

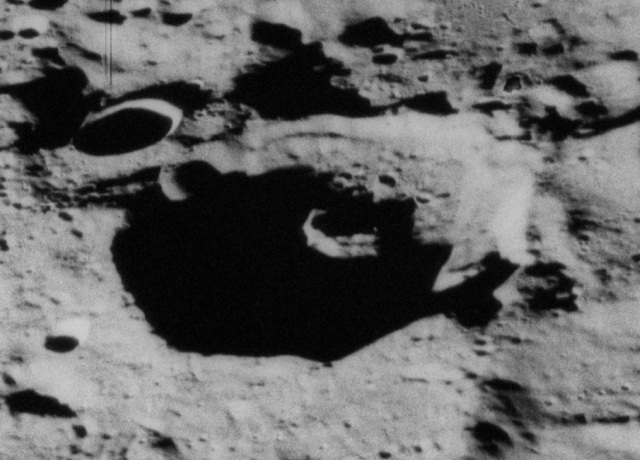
Oblique Apollo 16 mapping camera image

Kidinnu is an impact crater on the Moon's far side. It lies to the south of the crater H. G. Wells and to the southeast of Cantor.

This is a somewhat unevenly formed crater with an outer rim that forms a rounded polygon. The inner wall varies in width, with the narrowest stretch along the outward-bulging northeast. There are no craters of note along the rim or within the interior. The interior floor is uneven, with a central ridge that runs to the southern edge.

Prior to formal naming by the IAU in 1970, Kidinnu was called Crater 122.

== Satellite craters ==
By convention these features are identified on lunar maps by placing the letter on the side of the crater midpoint that is closest to Kidinnu.

Kidinnu	Latitude	Longitude	Diameter
E	36.3° N	124.5° E	60 km
