= Leon Campbell (astronomer) =

American astronomer

Leon Campbell (January 20, 1881 in Cambridge, Massachusetts– May 10, 1951) was an American astronomer.

== Career ==
He is noted for his observations of variable stars at the Harvard College Observatory. He served as Recorder of Observations for the AAVSO from its earliest days in 1915, and continued until his retirement in the 1940s. (The title was later changed to Director of the AAVSO.) He also published a number of papers and a pair of books on the topic of variable stars.

== Awards and honors ==
- Pickering Memorial Astronomer, circa 1931.
- AAVSO Merit Award, 1944.
- The lunar crater Campbell is co-named for him and William W. Campbell.
- Recipient of honorary degree of Master of Arts from Harvard University, 1949.

== Bibliography ==
- Campbell, Leon and Jacchia, Luigi Giuseppe, "The story of variable stars", Philadelphia, The Blakiston company, 1941.
- Campbell, Leon, "Studies of Long Period Variables", Cambridge, MA, AAVSO, 1955.
