= Cantor (crater) =

Crater on the Moon

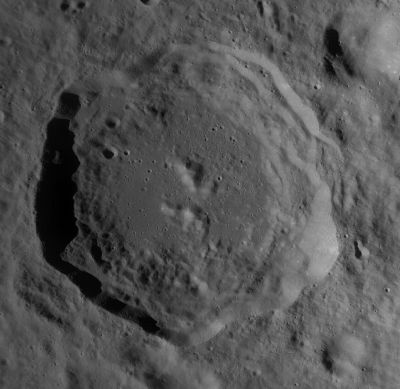
- LRO WAC mosaic
- Coordinates: 38.04°N 118.69°E
- Diameter: 75.72 km (47.05 mi)
- Depth: Unknown
- Colongitude: 241° at sunrise
- Eponym: Georg Cantor; Moritz Cantor

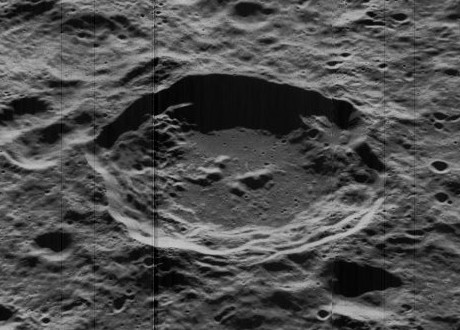
Oblique Lunar Orbiter 5 image, facing west

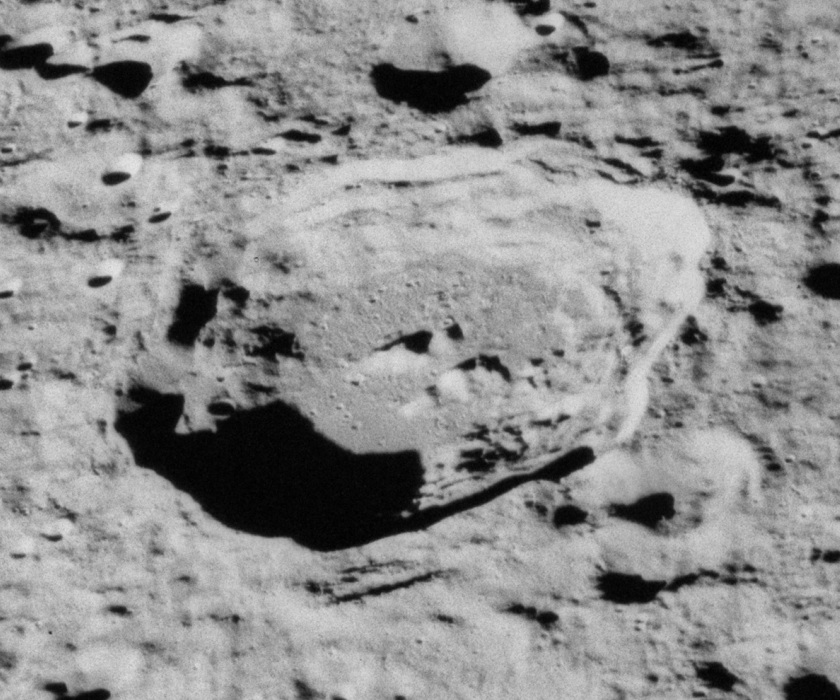
Oblique Apollo 16 mapping camera image

Cantor is a lunar impact crater that is located on the northern hemisphere on the far side of the Moon. This formation dates to the Late Imbrian epoch of the lunar geologic timescale. The outer rim of the crater has a distinctly hexagonal shape, and is slightly longer in the north–south direction. The interior walls are multiply terraced, although less so along the western rim. There is a low central peak at the midpoint of the floor, with multiple ridges nearby.

The terrain surrounding Cantor is heavily impacted with many small craters. The old and heavily eroded crater H. G. Wells is located to the northeast. To the southeast is Kidinnu.

This crater is named for Russian-German mathematician Georg Cantor (1845–1918) and German math historian Moritz Cantor (1829–1920); the two men are distantly related. Prior to being formally adopted by the IAU in 1970, Cantor was called Crater 121.

== Satellite craters ==
By convention these features are identified on lunar maps by placing the letter on the side of the crater midpoint that is closest to Cantor.

Cantor	Latitude	Longitude	Diameter
C	39.5° N	120.3° E	21 km
T	37.9° N	113.4° E	23 km
