= Campbell (lunar crater) =

Crater on the Moon

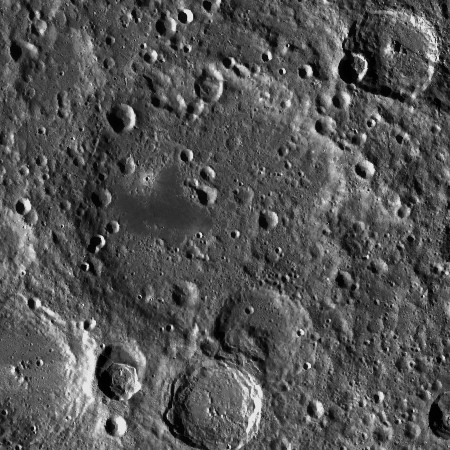
- LRO WAC image
- Coordinates: 45.57°N 152.91°E
- Diameter: 222.48 km (138.24 mi)
- Depth: 4.40 km (2.73 mi)
- Colongitude: 212° at sunrise
- Formation: Pre-Nectarian
- Eponym: Leon Campbell; William W. Campbell

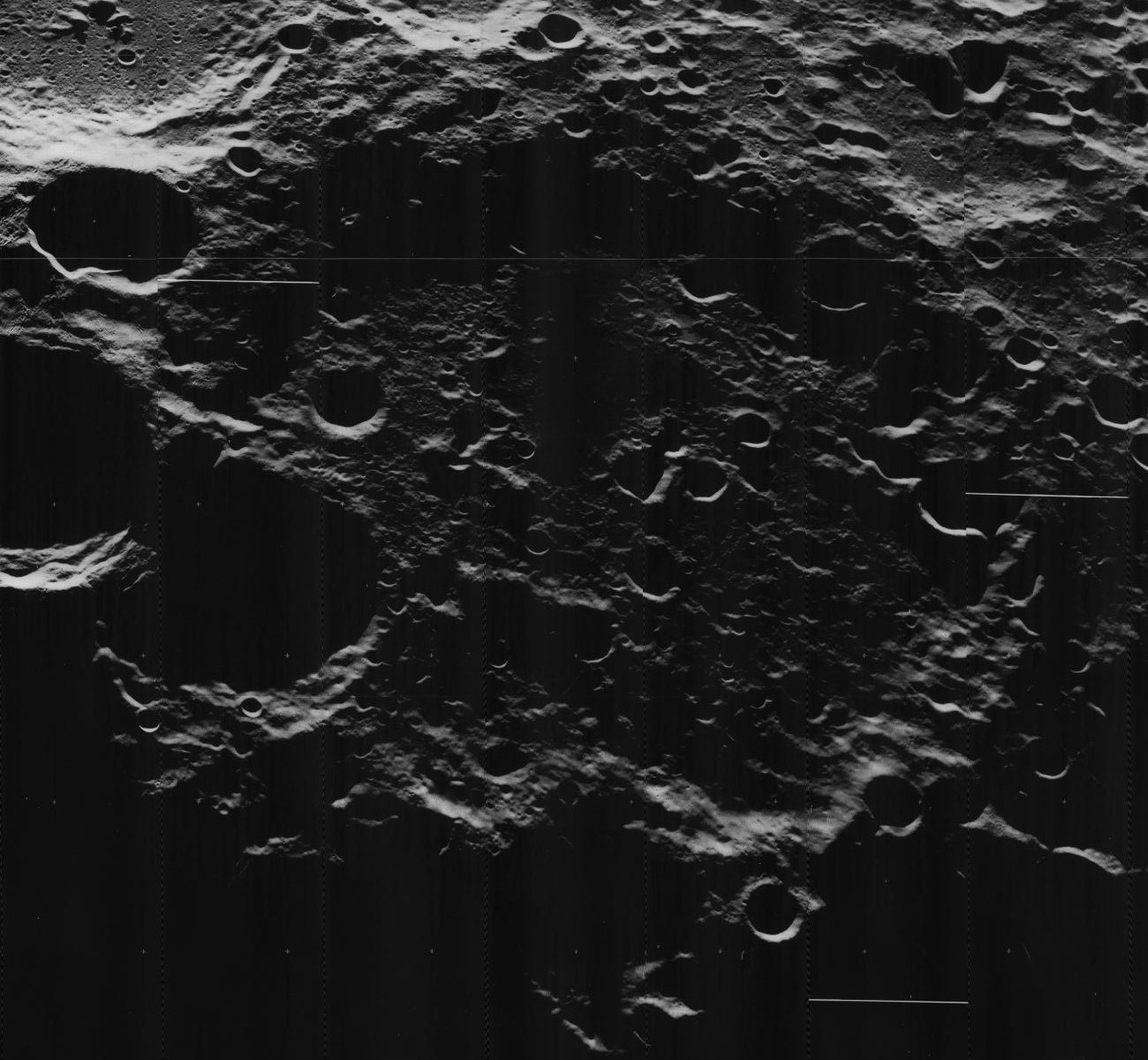
Oblique view from Lunar Orbiter 5, facing west

Campbell is a large lunar impact crater that is located in the northern hemisphere on the far side of the Moon. It lies to the southwest of the walled plain D'Alembert, an even larger formation. If Campbell were located on the near side of the Moon as seen from the Earth, it would form one of the largest visible craters, being slightly larger than Schickard. It is bordered by several craters of note, with Wiener to the southwest, Von Neumann just to the south, Ley overlying the southeast rim, and Pawsey to the west.

This formation dates to the Pre-Nectarian period of the lunar geologic timescale. It has been heavily worn and eroded by a history of impacts, leaving a circular rim that is an irregular ring of ridges and peaks. Multiple small craters lie along the rim and the inner wall, as well as across the interior floor. The most notable of these are Campbell X along the northwest inner rim and Campbell N near the southern inner wall.

Much of the inner floor is covered by a multitude of lesser impacts; the exception being a wide patch of the floor that was resurfaced by basaltic lava during the Late Imbrian. This area has a lower albedo than its surroundings, thus appearing dark. It stretches from the center of Campbell towards the western rim, and has an irregular perimeter. A small crater with a bright ray system impacted just north of this lava deposit.

This crater is named after American astronomers William W. Campbell (1862–1938) and Leon Campbell (1881–1951). Prior to formal naming by the IAU in 1970, Campbell was called Basin XI.

== Satellite craters ==
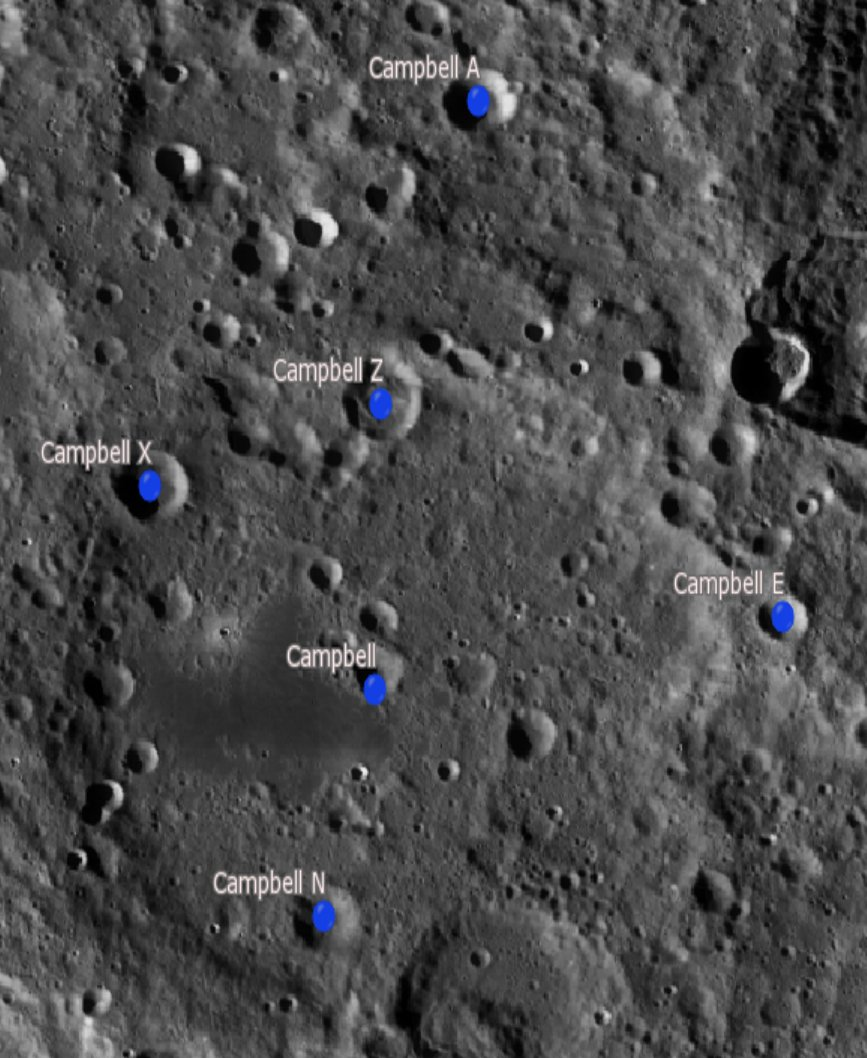
Satellite features of Campbell

By convention these features are identified on lunar maps by placing the letter on the side of the crater midpoint that is closest to Campbell.

Campbell	Latitude	Longitude	Diameter
A	52.2° N	155.2° E	20 km
E	46.4° N	158.6° E	15 km
N	43.2° N	152.3° E	23 km
X	47.7° N	149.4° E	24 km
Z	48.8° N	152.9° E	28 km
