= H. G. Wells (crater) =

Lunar crater

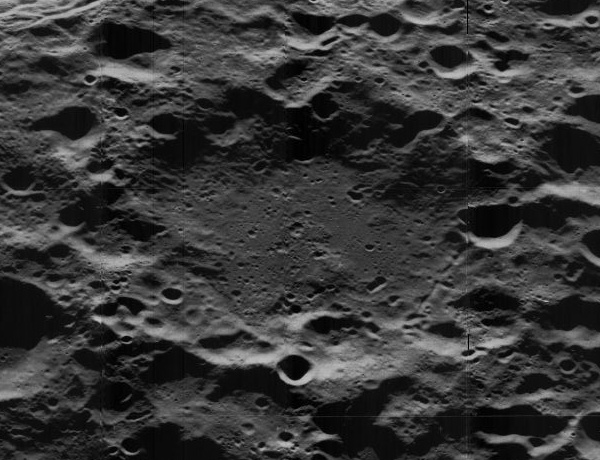
- Oblique Lunar Orbiter 5 image, facing west
- Coordinates: 40.84°N 122.63°E
- Diameter: 108.90 km (67.67 mi)
- Depth: Unknown
- Colongitude: 239° at sunrise
- Eponym: H. G. Wells

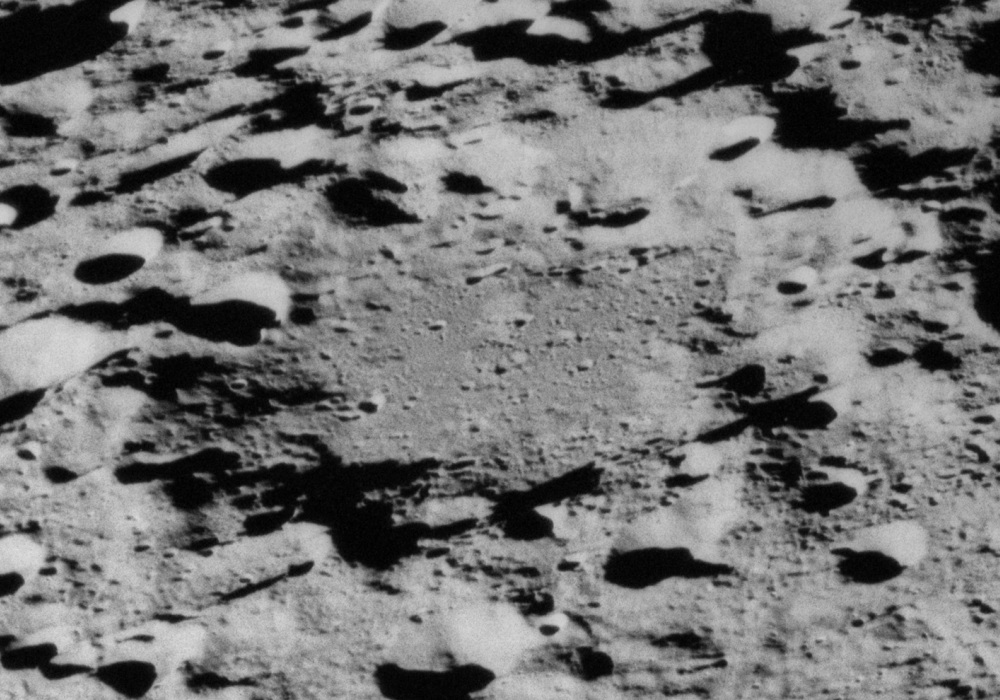
Oblique Apollo 16 mapping camera image

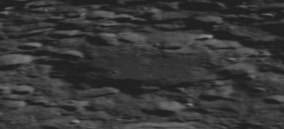
Oblique Apollo 14 Hasselblad camera image

H. G. Wells is a lunar impact crater that is located on the far side of the Moon, behind the northeastern limb. It lies to the south of the crater Millikan, and to the northeast of Cantor. Just to the southeast is the smaller Tesla.

This large formation is most notable for the extremely battered state of its outer rim. Little or nothing remains of the original rim, so completely has it been eroded and incised by smaller craters. As a result, the crater floor is now surrounded by a ring of irregular peaks and worn crater valleys. This rugged surroundings intrudes only part way into the interior, while the remaining floor is relatively level and in some places gently rolling. The interior is marked only by a multitude of tiny craters.

The crater is named after the author H. G. Wells whose works include the 1901 novel The First Men in the Moon. Prior to formal naming by the IAU in 1970, H. G. Wells was called Crater 48.

== Satellite craters ==
By convention these features are identified on lunar maps by placing the letter on the side of the crater midpoint that is closest to H. G. Wells.

H. G. Wells	Latitude	Longitude	Diameter
X	40.70° N	122.80° E	114 km
