= Claude Nicollier =

Swiss astronaut (born 1944)

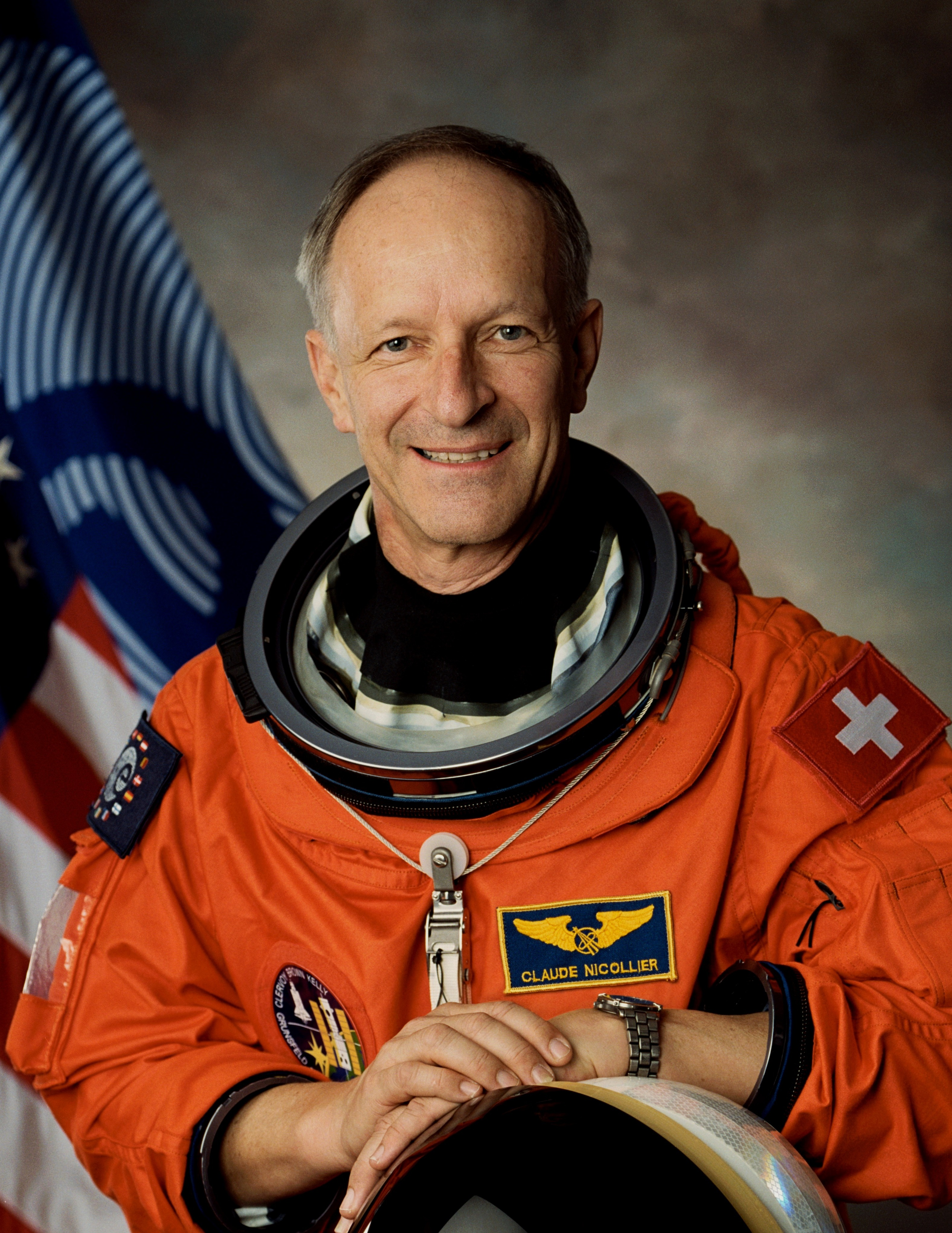
- Nicollier in 1999
- Born: 2 September 1944 (age 82); Vevey, Switzerland
- Occupations: Professor at the Swiss Federal Institute of Technology in Lausanne, Switzerland
- Spouse: Susana Perez
- Children: 2
- Space career

ESA astronaut
- Status: Retired from ESA
- Rank: Captain, Swiss Air Force
- Time in space: 42d 12h 05min
- Selection: 1978 ESA Group
- Total EVAs: 1
- Total EVA time: 8h, 10m
- Missions: STS-46, STS-61, STS-75, STS-103

Claude Nicollier (born 2 September 1944) is the first astronaut from Switzerland. He has flown on four Space Shuttle missions. His first spaceflight (STS-46) was in 1992, and his final spaceflight (STS-103) was in 1999. He took part in two servicing missions to the Hubble Space Telescope (called STS-61 and STS-103). During his final spaceflight he participated in a spacewalk, becoming the first European Space Agency astronaut to do so during a Space Shuttle mission (previous ESA astronauts conducted spacewalks aboard Mir, see List of spacewalks and moonwalks 1965–1999). In 2000 he was assigned to the Astronaut Office Extravehicular Activity Branch, while maintaining a position as Lead ESA Astronaut in Houston. Nicollier retired from ESA in April 2007.

He was appointed full professor of Spatial Technology at the École Polytechnique Fédérale de Lausanne on 28 March 2007.

He was an expert board member of Swiss Space Systems, until the company's dissolution.

== Early life and education ==
Nicollier was born September 2, 1944. After graduating from the Gymnase de la Cité (high school) in Lausanne in 1962, he studied physics at the University of Lausanne and received a Licentiate degree in 1970. He then worked as a graduate scientist from 1970 to 1973 at the Institute of Astronomy at the university and at the Geneva Observatory, before obtaining a post Diploma degree in astrophysics from the University of Geneva in 1975. In parallel, he became a Swiss Air Force pilot in 1966, in the Fliegerstaffel 5 on Hawker Hunter where he holds a commission as captain, and has logged 5,600 hours flying time, including 4,000 hours in jet aircraft. Later, in 1988, he graduated as a test pilot from the Empire Test Pilot's School in Boscombe Down, United Kingdom.

In 2004, he started teaching at the École Polytechnique Fédérale de Lausanne, and became a full professor in March 2007.

== Astronaut career ==
Concurrently with his part-time research activities, he joined the Swiss Air Transport School in Zürich and became an airline pilot in 1974, assigned as a DC-9 pilot for Swissair. At the end of 1976, he accepted a Fellowship at the European Space Agency’s (ESA) Space Science Department at Noordwijk, Netherlands, where he worked as a research scientist in various airborne infrared astronomy programs. In July 1978, he was selected by ESA as a member of the first group of European astronauts. Under agreement between ESA and NASA, he joined NASA Astronaut Group 9 selected in May 1980 for astronaut training as a mission specialist. Unlike colleague Wubbo Ockels—who withdrew from training to focus on Spacelab and remained an ESA payload specialist—Nicollier became a mission specialist, the first non-American to become a full-time NASA astronaut.

Nicollier's technical assignments in the Astronaut Office have included flight software verification in the Shuttle Avionics Integration Laboratory (SAIL), participation in the development of retrieval techniques for the Tethered Satellite System (TSS), Remote Manipulator System (RMS), and International Space Station (ISS) robotics support. From the spring of 1996 to the end of 1998, he was head of the Astronaut Office Robotics Branch. From the year 2000 on, he was assigned to the Astronaut Office EVA (Extravehicular Activity) Branch, while maintaining a position as Lead ESA astronaut in Houston. Nicollier retired from ESA in April 2007.

He is a member of the Swiss Astronomical Society, the Astronomical Society of the Pacific, the Swiss Air Force Officers Society (AVIA), and the Swiss Academy of Engineering Sciences and fellow of the British Interplanetary Society. He is also an honorary member of the Swiss Aero Club, the Swiss Society of Engineers and Architects, and the Swiss Astronomy Day Society.

Nicollier has spent over 1000 hours in space (42 days, 12 hours and 5 minutes), including one space walk lasting 8 hours and 10 minutes. He served as mission specialist on four missions with four different space shuttles.

=== STS-61-K ===
His first spaceflight was planned to be STS-61-K, which had been scheduled for October 1986, but was cancelled following the Space Shuttle Challenger disaster.

=== STS-46 ===
Nicollier's first spaceflight was as a mission specialist on the 8-day Space Shuttle mission aboard Atlantis, called STS-46, in 1992. The crew deployed the European Retrievable Carrier EURECA, as well as the Tethered Satellite System-1, which was a joint NASA and Italian Space Agency project.

=== STS-61 ===
His second spaceflight was as a mission specialist on the 10-day mission aboard Endeavour, called STS-61, in 1993. It was the first mission to perform maintenance on the Hubble Space Telescope, which had been launched three years previously. The nature of this repair was to correct a 2 micrometer error in the 2.4 meter diameter primary mirror, which caused significant distortion of the images taken by the telescope.

=== STS-75 ===
In 1996 he took part in STS-75, aboard Space Shuttle Columbia, which deployed TSS-1R, which was a follow-up mission to TSS-1 which had been deployed during STS-46.

=== STS-103 ===
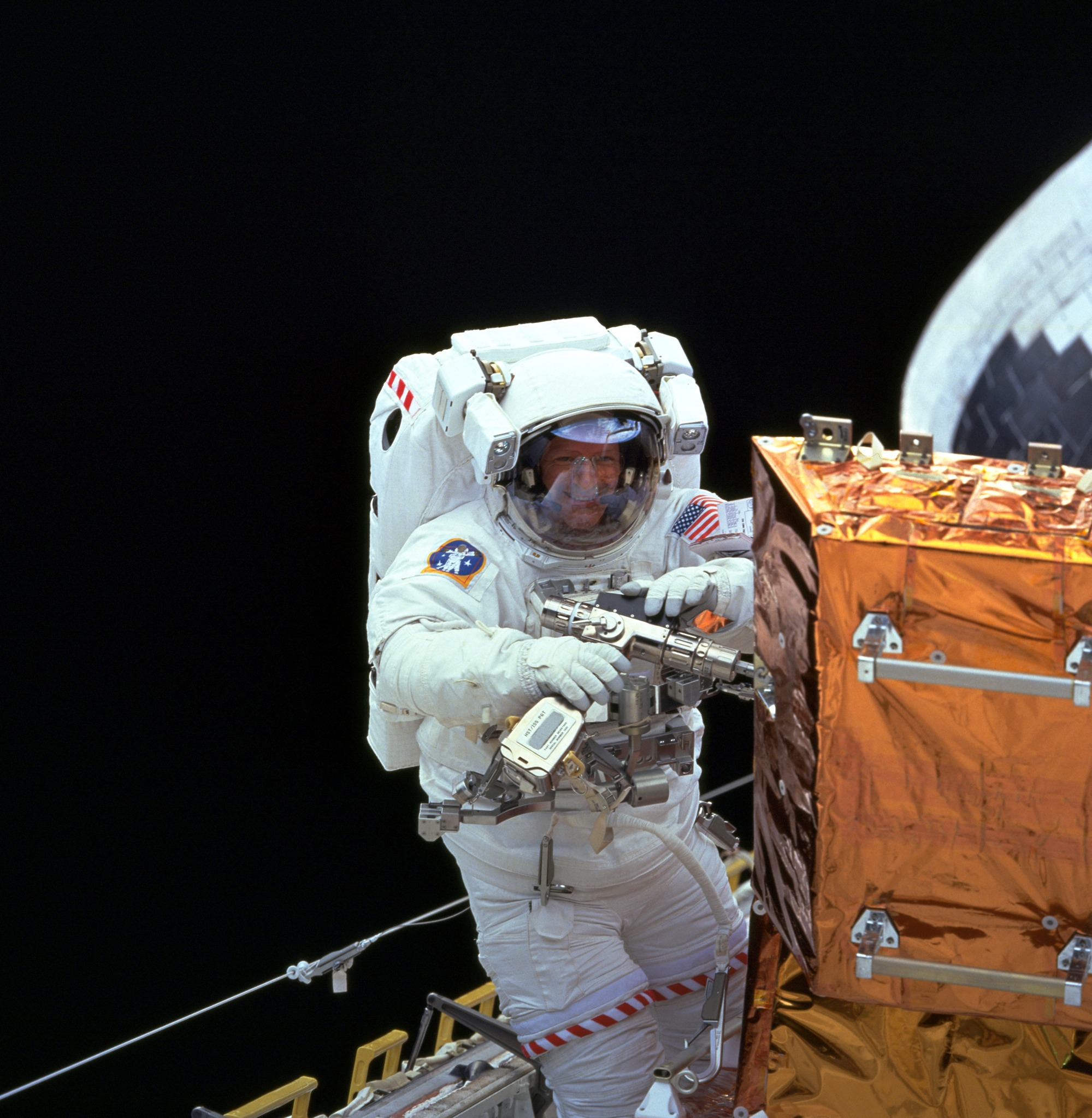
Nicollier during the second of three STS-103 extravehicular activities

His final spaceflight was an eight-day mission aboard Space Shuttle Discovery, called STS-103, in 1999. It was the third servicing mission to the Hubble Space Telescope. During this mission Nicollier participated in an 8-hour spacewalk; it was his first, and the first of any ESA astronaut during a Space Shuttle mission.

Following his astronaut career, he delivered a lecture on his experiences, “Revisiting Hubble,” at the first Starmus Festival in 2011 in the Canary Islands. The talk was published in the book Starmus: 50 Years of Man in Space.

== Awards and honors ==
Nicollier has received several awards and honors:

- Doctor Honoris Causa from Business School Lausanne (2011)
- Swiss Astronomy Award (2007)
- NASA Distinguished Service Medal (2001)
- Albert Einstein Medal (1998)
- NASA Space Flight Medals (1992, 1993, 1996, 1999)
- Prix d'honneur de la Fondation Pro Aero, Switzerland (1992)
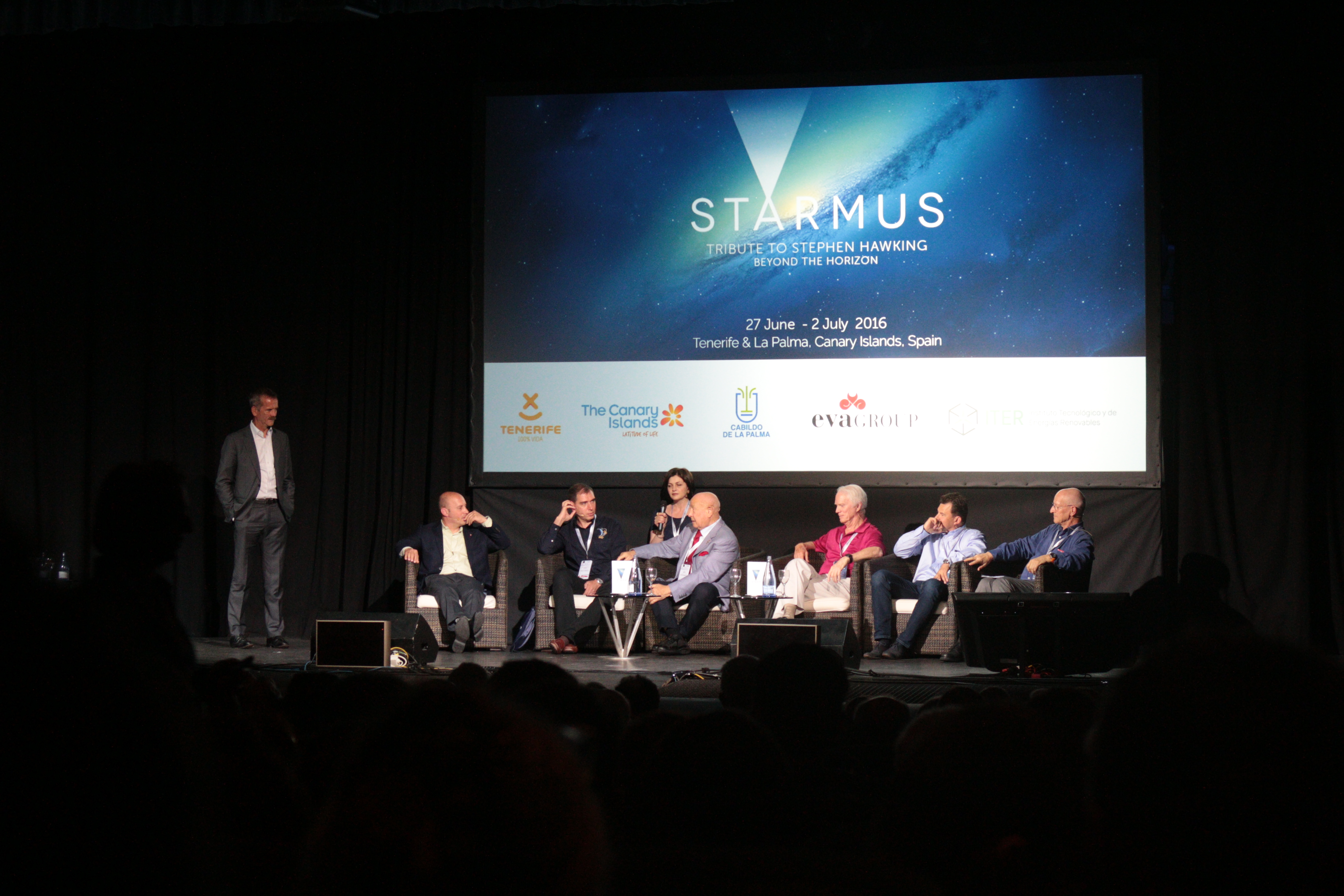
  Claude Nicollier (right), Rusty Schweickart and Alexei Leonov at the 2016 Starmus Festival
- Yuri Gagarin Gold Medal from the International Aeronautical Federation (1994)
- Silver Medal from the Académie Nationale de l'Air et de l'Espace, France (1994)
- Collier Trophy (awarded to the crew of STS-61) from the National Aeronautics Association (1994)
- Prix de l'Université de Lausanne (1994)
- Honorary doctorates from the Swiss Federal Institute of Technology, Lausanne, and the University of Geneva (both in 1994)
- International Space Hall of Fame (1997)

== Personal life ==
He is widowed (Susana Perez of Monterrey, Mexico, died December 2007). Together they had two daughters.

== Other work ==
Nicollier made a cameo appearances on the TV show Home Improvement by Touchstone Television (Series 3, Episode 24, "Reality Bytes").

== Notes ==
This article is originally based on Claude Nicollier's biography from NASA, which is in the public domain.
