= Feoktistov (crater) =

Crater on the Moon

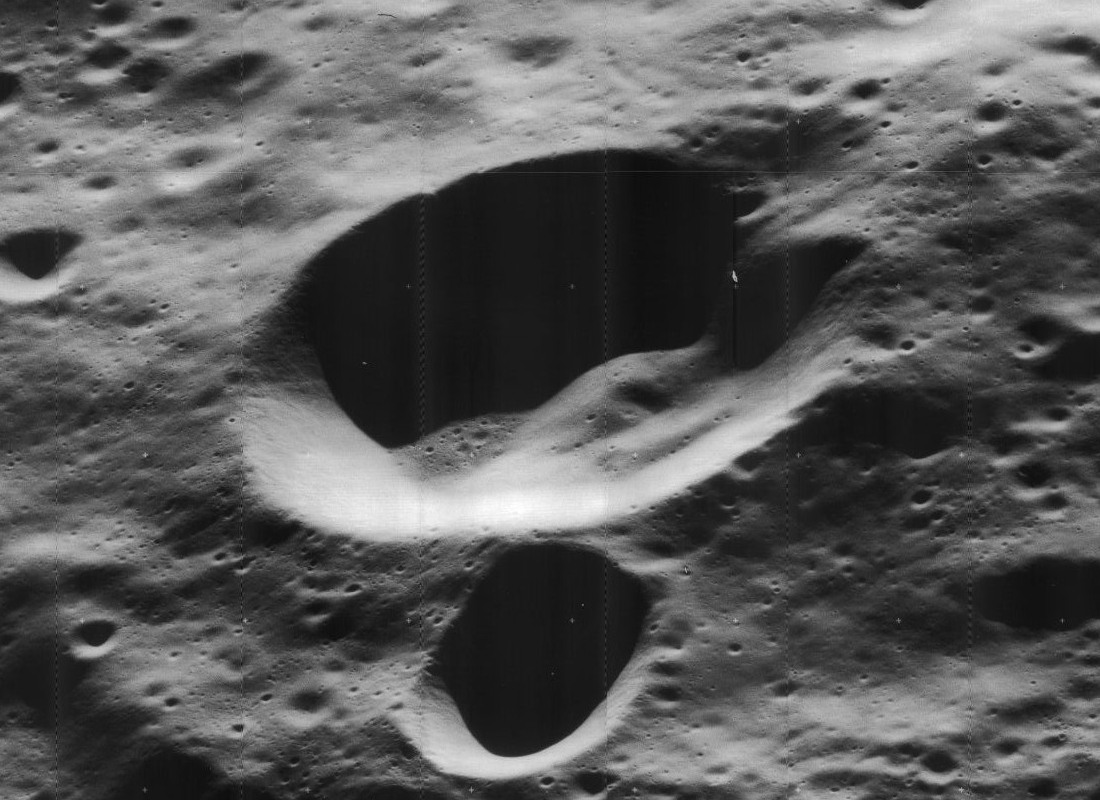
- Oblique Lunar Orbiter 5 image
- Coordinates: 30.9°N 140.7°E
- Diameter: 22.06 km (13.71 mi)
- Depth: Unknown
- Colongitude: 220° at sunrise
- Eponym: Konstantin P. Feoktistov

Feoktistov is a small lunar impact crater on the far side of the Moon. It lies in the northern hemisphere, to the northwest of the Mare Moscoviense basin and Tereshkova crater. To the north-northwest is Kurchatov crater.

This crater has a small outward extension along the northern side, giving it the appearance of two overlapping craters that have merged. There are slight indentations of the rim along the east and northwest sides. The rim is otherwise rounded and not significantly worn. Apart from an irregular strip in the northeast, the floor is relatively featureless. There is a 4-km long lobate scarp, located in the highlands to the north of Feoktistov.

The crater was named in honor of cosmonaut Konstantin Feoktistov (1926-2009), who was the first non-military person in space, flying on Voskhod 1 in 1964. Its designation was officially adopted by the International Astronomical Union in 1970.

== Satellite craters ==
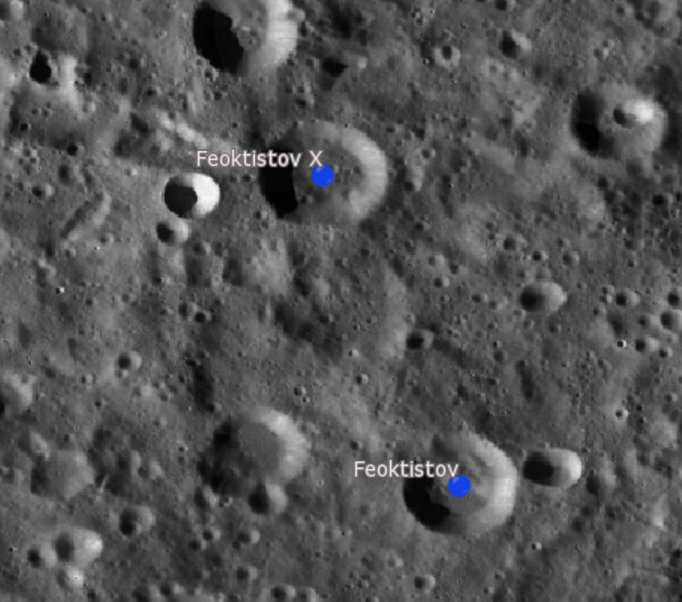
Feoktistov and satellite crater

By convention these features are identified on lunar maps by placing the letter on the side of the crater midpoint that is closest to Feoktistov.

Feoktistov	Latitude	Longitude	Diameter
X	33.1° N	139.5° E	23 km
