= Titova =

Titova may refer to:

- Korenica, intermittently named Titova Korenica, a village in Croatia
- Titova Mitrovica, city and municipality in northern Kosovo
- The feminine form of the Russian surname Titov
