= Stephen Hawking Medal for Science Communication =

Science award

- Awarded for: Recognizes the work of those helping to promote the public awareness of science through different disciplines such as music, arts and cinema.
- Presented by: Starmus Festival
- First award: 2015
- Website: https://www.starmus.com/stephen-hawking-medal

The Stephen Hawking Medal for Science Communication is an honor bestowed by the Starmus Festival to individuals and teams in science and the arts to recognize the work of those helping to promote the public awareness of science.

== History ==
The Stephen Hawking Medal for Science Communication was initially announced on December 16, 2015, at the Royal Society in London, by a panel including Professor Stephen Hawking, the Starmus founding director Professor Garik Israelian, Sir Brian May, Professor Richard Dawkins, Alexei Leonov, Nobel laureate Sir Harold Kroto, Kip Thorne, Hans Zimmer and Sarah Brightman were special guests during the ceremony and made speeches.

The Stephen Hawking Medals are awarded to the Science Communicator of the Year in three categories:

- Music & Arts
- Science Writing
- Films & Entertainment
- Lifetime Achievement

During the presentation of the Medal, Stephen Hawking said:

"I am delighted to present the Stephen Hawking Medal for Science Communication to be awarded at STARMUS festivals. This medal will recognize excellence in science communication across different media, whether in writing, broadcasting, music, film, or fine art. This takes account of the great diversity, richness, creativity, and scope that science communicators use to reach a wide popular audience... I am very pleased to support and honour the work of science communicators, and look forward to awarding The Stephen Hawking Medal at STARMUS Festivals."

The first Stephen Hawking Medals for Science Communication were awarded at the third Starmus Festival in June 2016. The winners were selected by Stephen Hawking himself and received the Medal from him.

Professor Hawking said of the award:

By engaging with everyone from school children to politicians to pensioners, science communicators put science right at the heart of daily life. Bringing science to the people brings people into science. This matters to me, to you, to the world as a whole.

After Starmus III, the Starmus Advisory Board joined Stephen Hawking in the selection of winners.

== The medal ==
The design of the medal used a portrait of Professor Hawking by cosmonaut Alexei Leonov, the first man to perform a spacewalk and member of the Advisory Board of Starmus since its first edition. The other side combines the image of Alexei Leonov during the first spacewalk, and the "Red Special" – Brian May’s guitar – to demonstrate music, another major component of the Starmus Festival. The Medal itself was designed by Alexei Leonov and Brian May.

Brian May said about the Medal: "The Stephen Hawking Medal will be awarded for the first time at Starmus III to the human being who by their sharing of science and music with us all, is the greatest inspiration to the next generation of artists and scientists."

During the Stephen Hawking Medal Award Ceremony at Starmus III, Alexei Leonov pointed out: "I did a sketch of Stephen Hawking… and when I showed it to him, I saw a big smile on his face. The Stephen Hawking Medal created by STARMUS will be awarded to the best science communicators in the world in three categories: science and/or science-fiction writers, musicians and artists, and people in the film and entertainment industry. I am honoured to be a part of this historical medal."

== Recipients ==
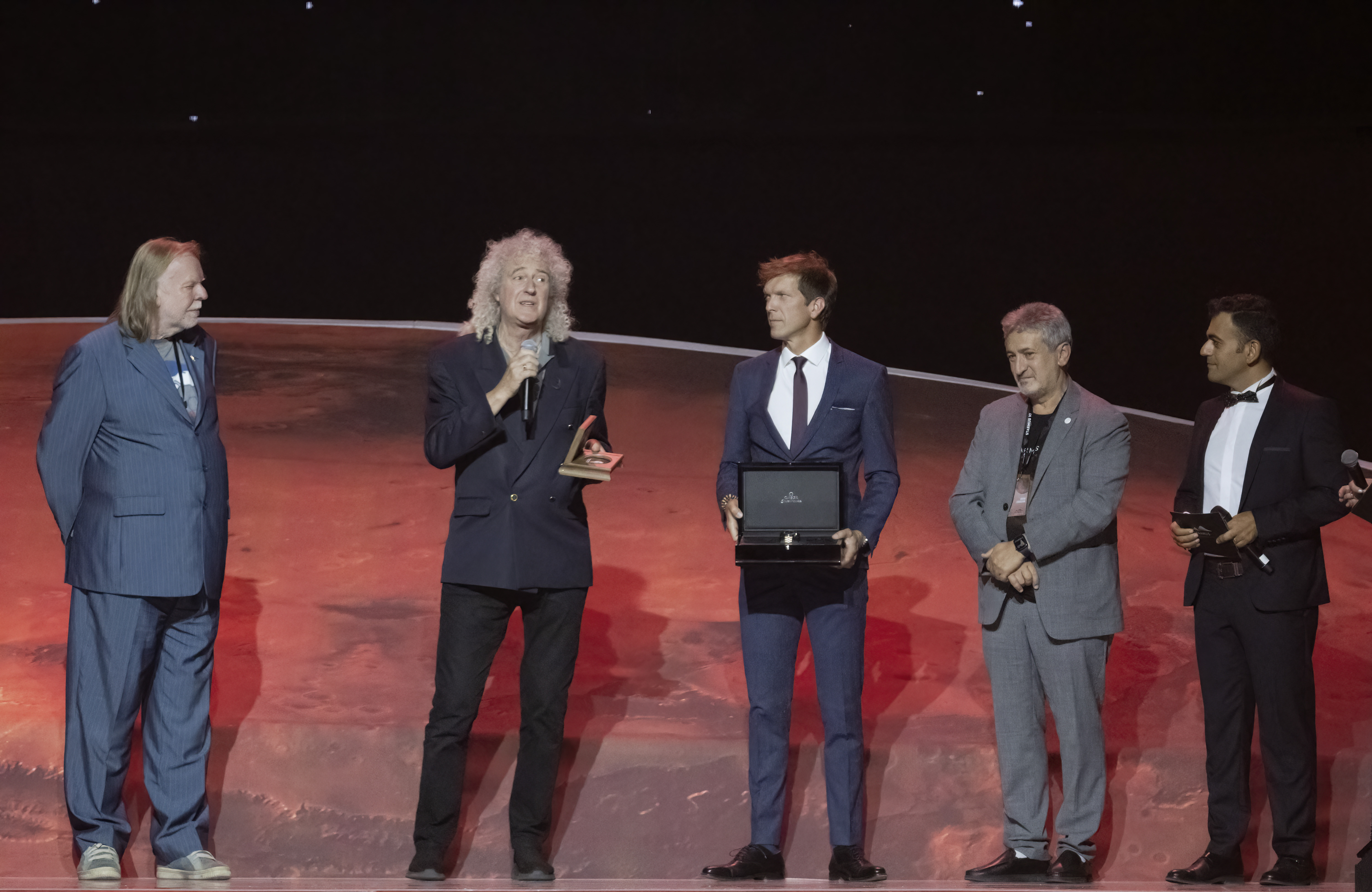
Brian May receives Stephen Hawking medal at Starmus VI Festival Yerevan, Armenia.

=== 2016 ===
- Music & Arts: Hans Zimmer
- Science writing: Jim Al-Khalili
- Films & Entertainment: Science documentary Particle Fever

=== 2017 ===
- Music & Arts: Jean-Michel Jarre
- Science Writing: Neil deGrasse Tyson
- Films & Entertainment: Sitcom The Big Bang Theory

=== 2019 ===
- Music & Arts: Brian Eno
- Science Writing: Elon Musk
- Films & Entertainment: Science documentary Apollo 11
- Lifetime Achievement: Buzz Aldrin

=== 2022 ===
- Music & Arts: Brian May
- Science Writing: Diane Ackerman
- Films & Entertainment: NASA TV and Communications Office
- Lifetime Achievement: Jane Goodall

=== 2024 ===
- Music & Arts: Laurie Anderson
- Science Writing: Sylvia Earle
- Films & Entertainment: Christopher Nolan
- Lifetime Achievement: David Attenborough
