= Konstantin Feoktistov =

Soviet engineer and cosmonaut (1926–2009)

- Константин Феоктистов
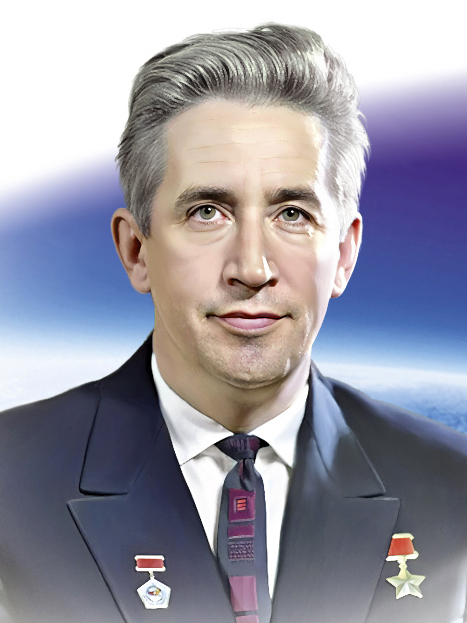
- Feoktistov in 1964
- Born: 7 February 1926; Voronezh, RSFSR, Soviet Union
- Died: 21 November 2009 (aged 83); Moscow, Russia
- Other name: Rubin
- Education: Bauman Moscow Higher Technical School
- Occupation: Engineer
- Awards: Hero of the Soviet Union
- Space career

Cosmonaut
- Time in space: 1d 00h 17m
- Selection: Civilian Specialist Group 1
- Missions: Voskhod 1

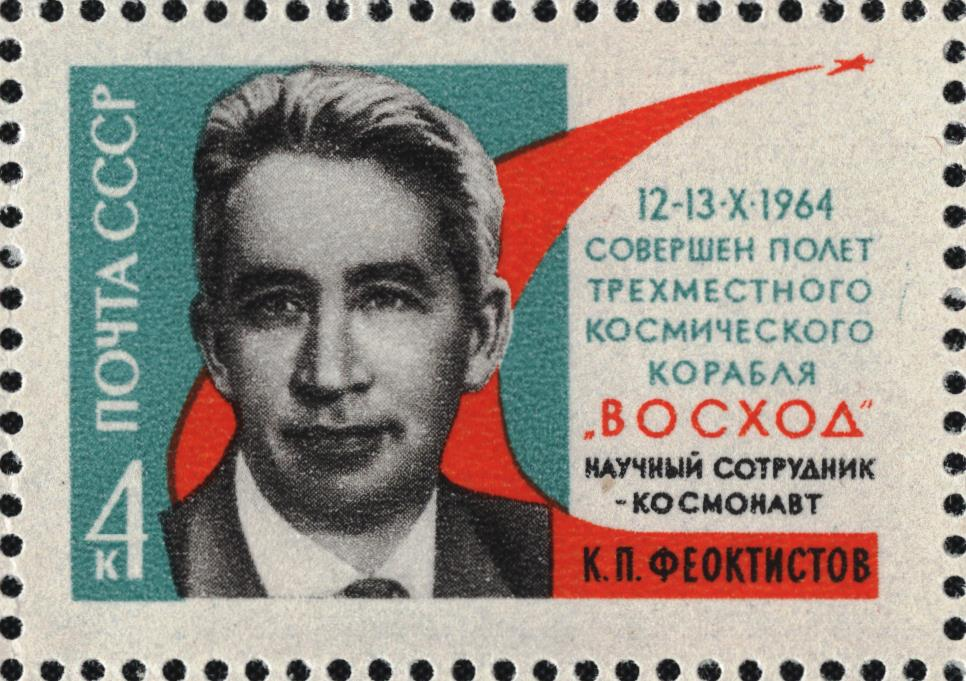
1964 USSR postage stamp honouring Konstantin Feoktistov

Konstantin Petrovich Feoktistov (Russian: Константин Петрович Феоктистов; 7 February 1926 – 21 November 2009) was Russian engineer and a cosmonaut in the former Soviet space program.

As a cosmonaut Feoktistov flew on Voskhod 1, the first spacecraft to carry three crew members. (Note: Voskhod 1 was also the first spacecraft to carry more than one crew member, preceding the two-man flights of the American Gemini Program. Despite this, Voskhod 1 did not represent the first time that more than one human had been in space at the same time. This first occurred when Andriyan Nikolayev and Pavel Popovich simultaneously orbited Earth in separate spacecraft—Vostok 3 and Vostok 4, respectively.) Feoktistov also wrote several books on space technology and exploration. The Feoktistov crater on the far side of the Moon is named in his honor.

== Biography ==
During the Nazi occupation of Voronezh, at the age of just 16, Feoktistov fought with the Soviet Army against the German troops, carrying out reconnaissance missions for the Voronezh Front. After being captured by a Waffen-SS Army patrol, Feoktistov was shot by a German officer. However, the bullet went right through his chin and neck and did not kill him. Feoktistov could crawl out later and then make his way to the Soviet lines.

After the war was over, Feoktistov enrolled in the Bauman Moscow Higher Technical School as an engineering student and he graduated in 1949. Feoktistov also later earned a doctorate in physics. He joined Mikhail Tikhonravov's OKB (design bureau), and in 1955, Feoktistov formed part of the team that went on to design the Sputnik satellites, the Vostok space capsule, the Voskhod space capsule, and the Soyuz space capsule under the leadership of the Soviet Chief Designer Sergey Korolev. During this time, Feoktistov also worked on a design for an ion-propelled spacecraft capable of taking humans to Mars.

In 1964, Feoktistov was selected as part of a group of engineers for cosmonaut training, and in October of that same year, he was hastily assigned to the multi-disciplinary Voskhod 1 crew. He was the first civilian to make a space flight, and the only cosmonaut in the Soviet Union who was not a member of the Communist Party of the Soviet Union. He spent just over 24 hours and 17 minutes in space during his space flight.

After the flight of Voskhod 1, Feoktistov's training for any further space mission was discontinued for medical reasons. However, Feoktistov continued his outer space engineering work, and he later became the head of the Soviet space design bureau that designed the Salyut and Mir space stations.

In October 1969, Konstantin Feoktistov and Georgi Beregovoi traveled as guests of NASA throughout the US, visiting any city they chose and Disneyland in California – they were joined on the trip by US astronauts as hosts, including Eugene Cernan, Neil Armstrong and others. Kirk Douglas and others hosted receptions for them in Hollywood – they were protected by special agents of the US State Department on request of NASA. Almost every place they went when accompanied by Eugene Cernan, if a band was present the song "Fly Me to the Moon" was played – when they visited Disneyland they enjoyed the ride Trip To The Moon, then joked with the US astronauts that they went to Disneyland and not the Moon. It was a trip that all enjoyed and international friendships were made. Feoktistov resigned from his engineering position with Energia and then returned to Bauman Moscow Higher Technical School as a professor in 1990.

== Honours and awards ==
- Hero of the Soviet Union
- Title Pilot-Cosmonaut of the USSR
- Order of Lenin
- Two Orders of the Patriotic War 1st class
- Two Orders of the Red Banner of Labour
- Order of the Badge of Honour
- Medal "For the Victory over Germany in the Great Patriotic War 1941–1945"
- Medal "For the Development of Virgin Lands"
- State Prize of the USSR
- Lenin Prize
- Hero of Socialist Labour (Vietnam)
