= Fliegerstaffel 5 =

Fliegerstaffel 5 5ème Escadrille Squadriglia d'aviazione 5
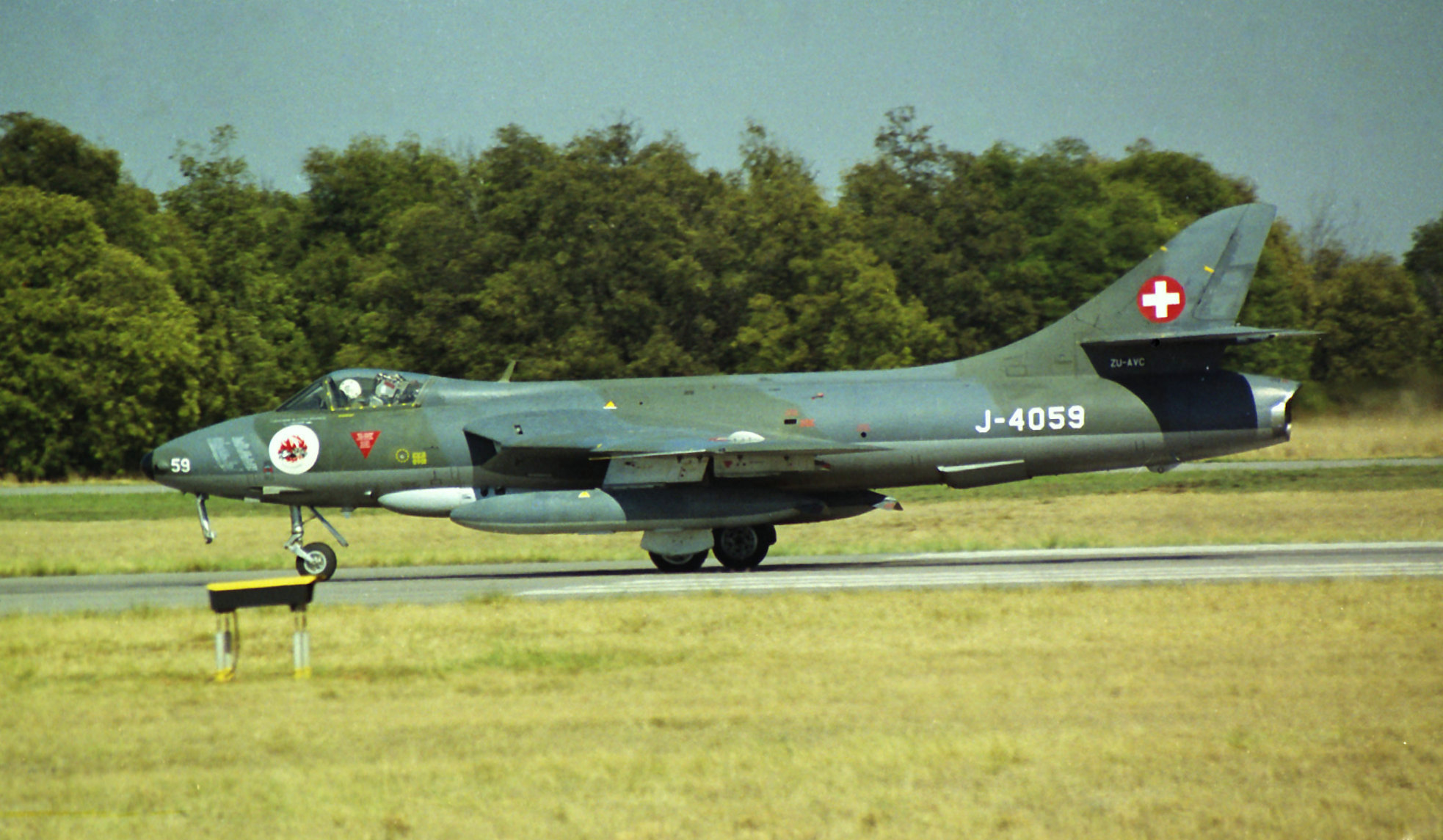
- Hawker Hunter of Fliegerstaffel 5
- Active: 1925–1994
- Country: Switzerland
- Branch: Swiss Air Force
- Role: Fighter squadron
- Garrison/HQ: Interlaken Airbase

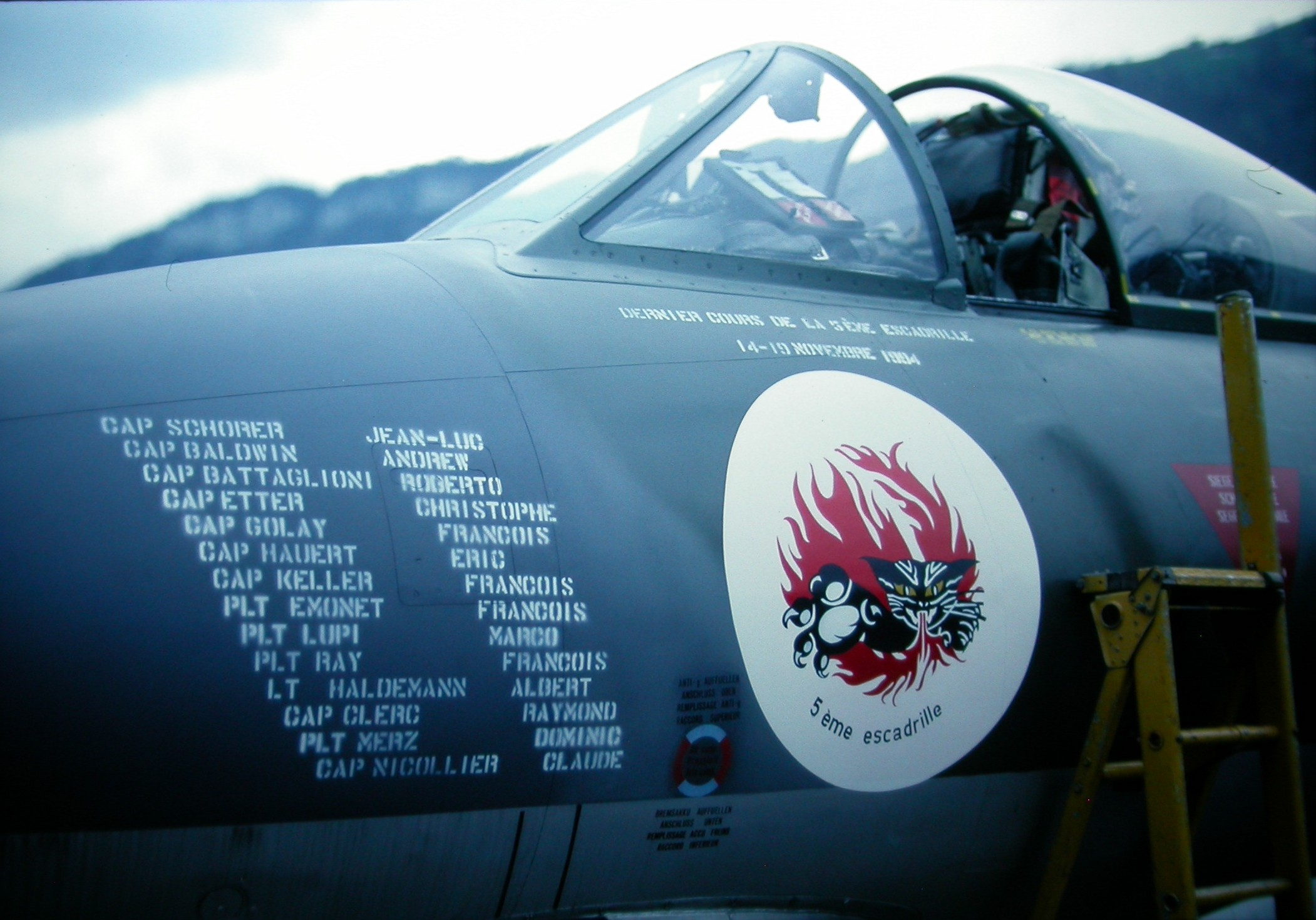
The old emblem of the Fliegerstaffel 5 on a Hawker Hunter in November 1994 - in addition with the names of pilots from Fliegerstaffel 5

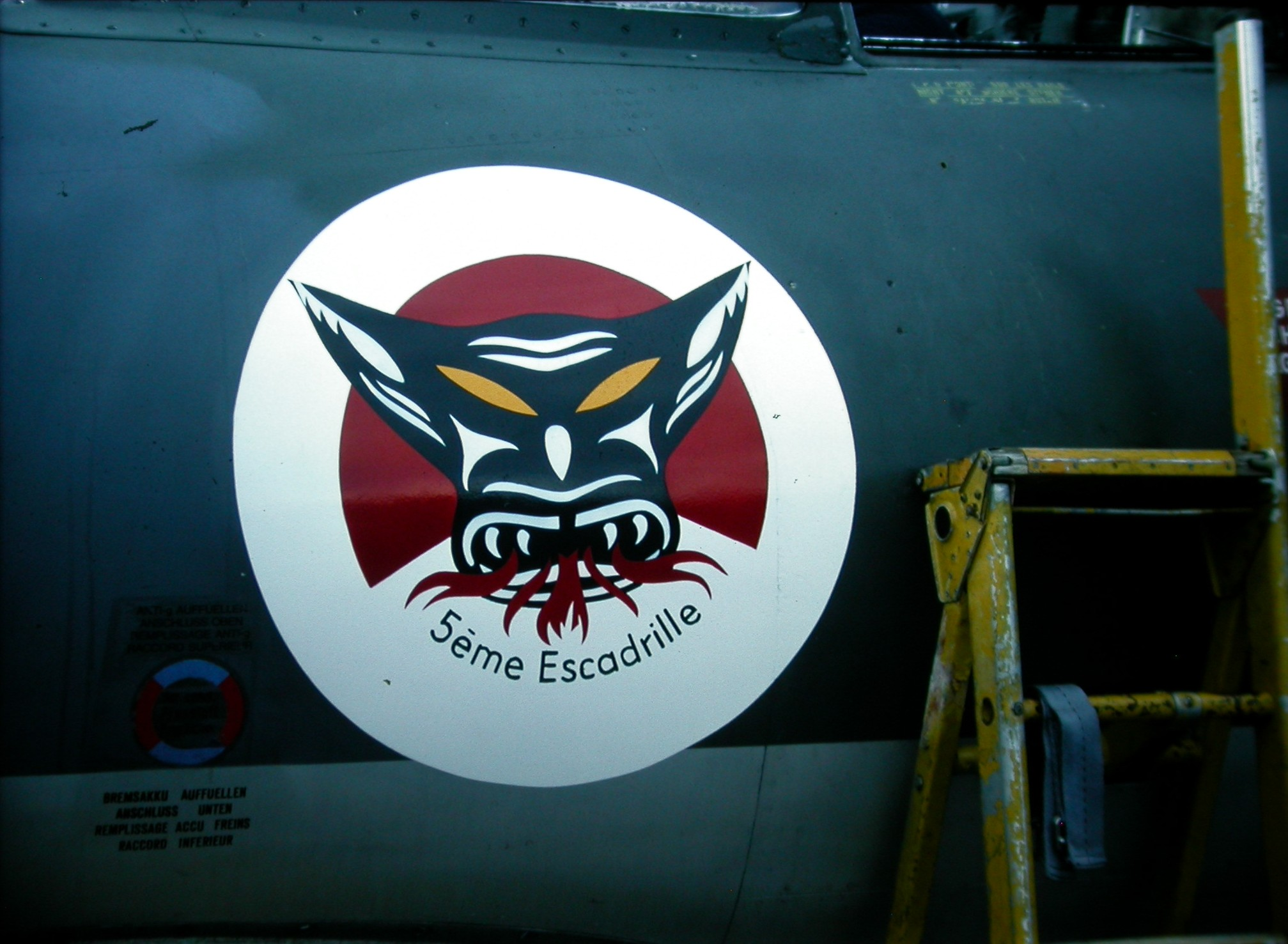
A version of the new Badge on a Hawker Hunter

Fliegerstaffel 5 ("Fighter Squadron 5") was a unit of the Swiss Air Force. It was equipped with the Hawker Hunter. Its home base was Interlaken Air Base. Fliegerstaffel 5 carried as a coat of arms a black lynx with yellow eyes, which stretched its right paw with claws. From his mouth came red flames, which went into the background. The badge was round and had a white base. Under the lynx was written in black 5ème escadrille. Later, the badge was changed into a shield-shaped coat-of-arms with a stylized lynx head, often mistaken as a dragon head.

== History ==
The unit was founded in 1925 as Fliegerkompanie 5, flying Häfeli DH-5 and EKW C-35 biplanes. In 1940 they were replaced by the new Morane D-3800 fighters. In 1945, during a reorganization, the unit was redesignated Fliegerstaffel 5. From 1951 to 1959 Fliegerstaffel 5 operated de Havilland D.H.100 Vampire jets. From 1959 they operated Hawker Hunter with Raron Airfield as their war base. They were later relocated to Interlaken until 1994 when the Hawker Hunter was put out of service and Fliegerstaffel 5 was disbanded. The military airfield at Interlaken continued for some time as a military helicopter base and competence center for war repairs/battle damage repair, until it was handed over to a civilian operator.

The most famous member of the Fliegerstaffel 5 was the Swiss astronaut Claude Nicollier who piloted the Hunter until the fliegerstaffel was disbanded in 1994.

== Aircraft flown ==
- Häfeli DH-5
- EKW C-36
- Morane D-3800
- de Havilland Vampire
- Hawker Hunter
