= Tereshkova (crater) =

Crater on the Moon

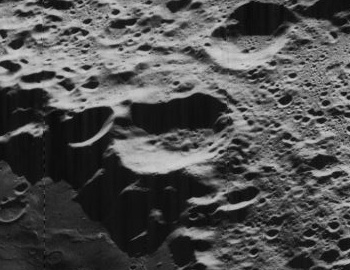
- Oblique Lunar Orbiter 5 image
- Coordinates: 28.4°N 144.3°E
- Diameter: 31 km
- Depth: Unknown
- Colongitude: 216° at sunrise
- Eponym: Valentina V. Tereshkova

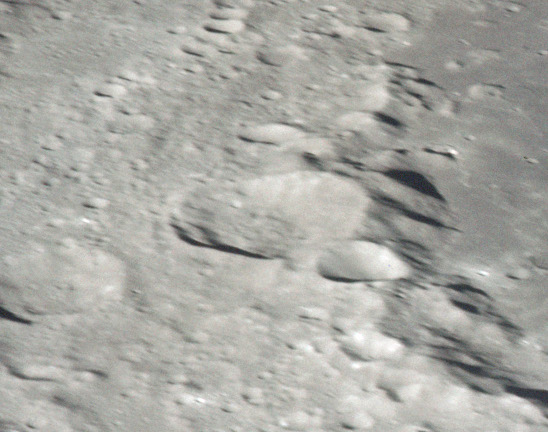
Oblique view from another angle from Apollo 13

Tereshkova is a lunar impact crater on the far side of the Moon. It is located along the western perimeter of the Mare Moscoviense, and to the southeast of the crater Feoktistov.

It is named for cosmonaut Valentina Tereshkova, the first woman in space. Normally craters are named after dead people; Tereshkova is among the first group of living people to have a crater named for them.

The rim of this crater resembles a rounded hexagon in outline. There is a small, cup-shaped crater near the outer edge of the southern rim. The eastern ramparts of this crater merge with the edge of the Mare Moscoviense. The rim edge is worn, but only tiny craterlets pit the surface of the edge and the crater interior.

== Satellite craters ==
By convention these features are identified on lunar maps by placing the letter on the side of the crater midpoint that is closest to Tereshkova.

Tereshkova	Latitude	Longitude	Diameter
U	28.7° N	142.8° E	23 km
