= Titov (crater) =

Crater on the Moon

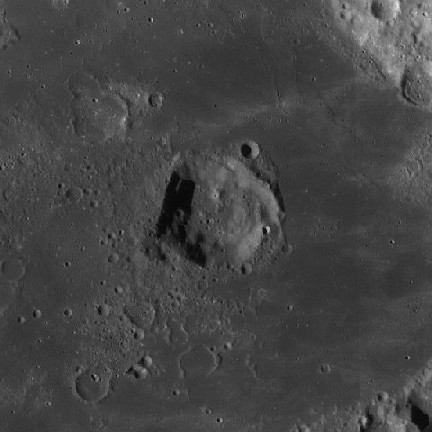
- LRO WAC image
- Coordinates: 28.6°N 150.5°E
- Diameter: 31 km
- Depth: Unknown
- Colongitude: 210° at sunrise
- Eponym: Gherman S. Titov

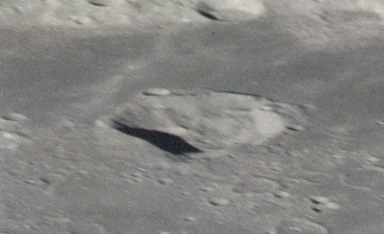
Oblique Apollo 13 image

Titov is a relatively small lunar impact crater on the far side of the Moon. The most unusual aspect of this crater is that it is located entirely within the Mare Moscoviense, one of the few maria found on the far side of the Moon. It lies to the northwest of the crater Komarov, in the northern half of the mare. It is named for cosmonaut Gherman Titov, the second person to orbit the Earth.

This is a worn crater that is almost entirely surrounded by basaltic lava flows. The interior of this crater has been resurfaced by lava, and it has the same low albedo as the surrounding terrain. There is a small craterlet along the exterior edge to the northeast.

This crater is labeled "Troy" on older maps.

== Satellite craters ==
By convention these features are identified on lunar maps by placing the letter on the side of the crater midpoint that is closest to Titov.

Titov	Latitude	Longitude	Diameter
E	29.1° N	153.9° E	22 km
