= Leonov (crater) =

Crater on the Moon

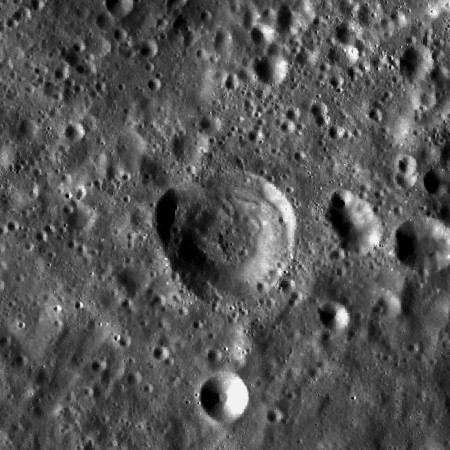
- LRO image
- Coordinates: 19.0°N 148.2°E
- Diameter: 33 km
- Depth: Unknown
- Colongitude: 212° at sunrise
- Eponym: Aleksei A. Leonov

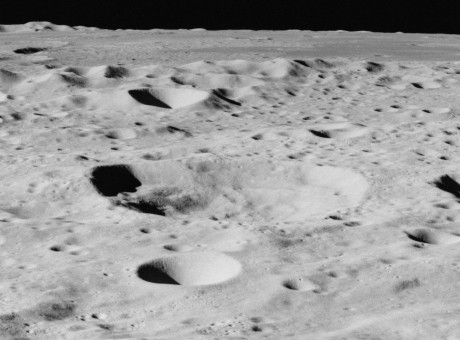
Oblique Apollo 16 image, facing north with Mare Moscoviense in the background

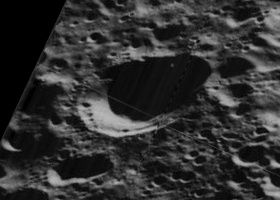
Oblique Lunar Orbiter 5 image

Leonov is a small lunar impact crater that lies to the south of Mare Moscoviense, one of the few maria on the far side of the Moon. This crater has a heart-shaped outline due to an outward bulge along the northwest side. The rim of Leonov is worn, and several tiny craterlets lie along the edge. The inner walls and interior floor are relatively featureless. The infrared spectrum of pure crystalline plagioclase has been identified on the south wall.

In 1970, the crater was named after Russian cosmonaut Alexei Leonov, the first human to perform an extravehicular activity (EVA or "spacewalk") in Earth orbit in 1965.
