= Titov =

Titov (Russian: Тито́в), or female form Titova (Russian: Тито́ва) is a Russian surname - composed of the Latin name Titus and affix -ov, meaning "descendant of". It may refer to:

== People ==
- Alexey Nikolayevich Titov, a composer
- Egor Titov, a former football player
- Gennady Titov, former KGB general
- German Titov, an ice hockey player
- Gherman Titov, a cosmonaut, piloted Vostok 2 in 1961
- Konstantin Titov, a politician, leader of the Russian Party of Social Democracy
- Lyudmila Titova, a Russian speed skater
- Nicolai Alexeyevich Titov, a composer
- Vasily Polikarpovich Titov, a composer
- Viktor Abrosimovich Titov, a film director on IMDb.
- Vladimir G. Titov, a cosmonaut, first mission Soyuz T-8 in 1983
- Yuri Titov, an Olympic gymnast

== Places ==
- Titov, a crater on Earth's moon
- List of places named after Tito
