= Alexei Leonov =

Soviet cosmonaut (1934–2019)

- Алексей Леонов
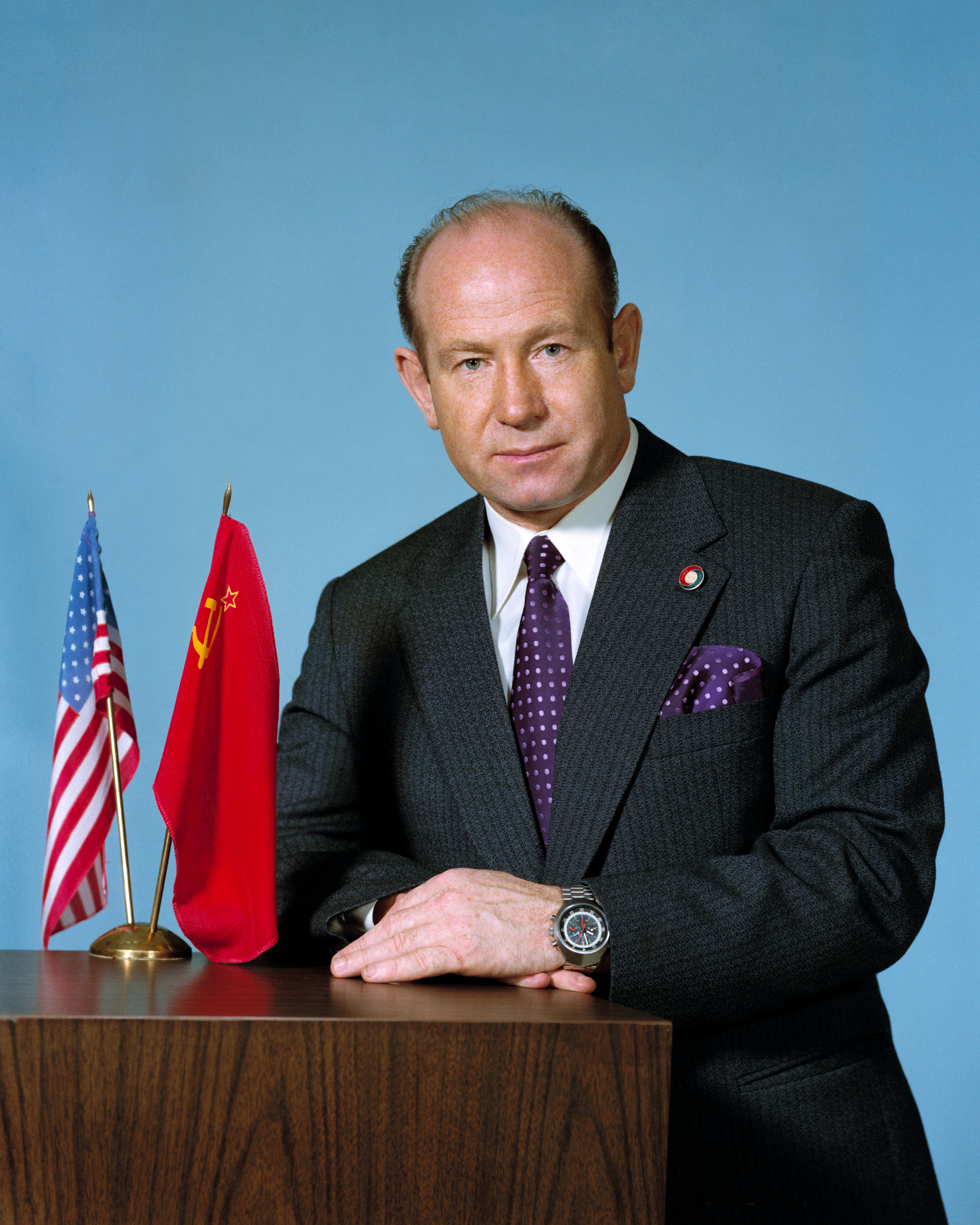
- Leonov in 1974
- Born: Alexei Arkhipovich Leonov; 30 May 1934; Listvyanka, West Siberian Krai, Russian SFSR, Soviet Union
- Died: 11 October 2019 (aged 85); Moscow, Russia
- Resting place: Federal Military Memorial Cemetery, Moscow Oblast
- Occupations: Fighter pilot, cosmonaut
- Awards: Hero of the Soviet Union (twice)
- Space career

Soviet cosmonaut
- Rank: Major general, Soviet Air Force
- Time in space: 7 days, 33 minutes, 3 seconds
- Selection: Air Force Group 1 (1960)
- Total EVAs: 1
- Total EVA time: 12 minutes, 9 seconds
- Missions: Voskhod 2; Soyuz 19 (Apollo–Soyuz Test Project)
- Mission insignia
- Retired: 26 January 1982

Alexei Arkhipovich Leonov (Note: Russian: Алексе́й Архи́пович Лео́нов, IPA: [ɐlʲɪkˈsʲej ɐrˈxʲipəvʲɪtɕ lʲɪˈonəf].) (30 May 1934 – 11 October 2019) was a Soviet and Russian cosmonaut and aviator, Air Force major general, writer, and artist. On 18 March 1965, he became the first person to conduct a spacewalk, exiting the capsule during the Voskhod 2 mission for 12 minutes and 9 seconds. He was also selected to be the first Soviet person to land on the Moon although the project was eventually cancelled.

In July 1975, Leonov commanded the Soyuz capsule in the Apollo–Soyuz mission, which docked in space for two days with an American Apollo capsule.

Leonov was twice Hero of the Soviet Union (1965, 1975), a Major General of Aviation (1975), laureate of the USSR State Prize (1981), and a member of the Supreme Council of the United Russia party (2002–2019).

== Early life and military service ==
Leonov was born on 30 May 1934 in Listvyanka, West Siberian Krai, Russian SFSR, in a Russian family. His grandfather had been forced to relocate to Siberia for his role in the 1905 Russian Revolution. Alexei was the eighth of nine surviving children born to Yevdokia (née Sotnikova) and Arkhip. (Note: Three additional children died in infancy) His father was an electrician and miner.

In 1936, his father was arrested and declared an "enemy of the people". Leonov wrote in his autobiography: "He was not alone: many were being arrested. It was part of a conscientious drive by the authorities to eradicate anyone who showed too much independence or strength of character. These were the years of Stalin's purges. Many disappeared into remote gulags and were never seen again."

The family moved in with one of his married sisters in Kemerovo. His father rejoined the family in Kemerovo after he was released. He was compensated for his wrongful imprisonment. Leonov used art as a way to provide more food for the family. He began his art career by drawing flowers on ovens and later painted landscapes on canvases.

The Soviet government encouraged its citizens to move to Soviet-occupied Prussia, so in 1948 his family relocated to Kaliningrad. Leonov graduated from secondary school (No. 21) in 1953. He applied to the Academy of Arts in Riga, Latvia, but decided not to attend due to the high tuition costs. Leonov decided to join a Ukrainian preparatory flying school in Kremenchug. He made his first solo flight in May 1955. While indulging in his passion for art by studying part-time in Riga, Leonov started an advanced two-year course to become a fighter pilot at the Chuguev Higher Air Force Pilots School in the Ukrainian SSR.

On 30 October 1957, Leonov graduated with an honours degree and was commissioned a lieutenant in the 113th Parachute Aviation Regiment, part of the 10th Engineering Aviation Division of the 69th Air Army in Kyiv. On 13 December 1959, he married Svetlana Pavlovna Dozenko. The next day he moved to East Germany to his new assignment with the 294th Reconnaissance Regiment of the 24th Air Army.

== Soviet space program ==
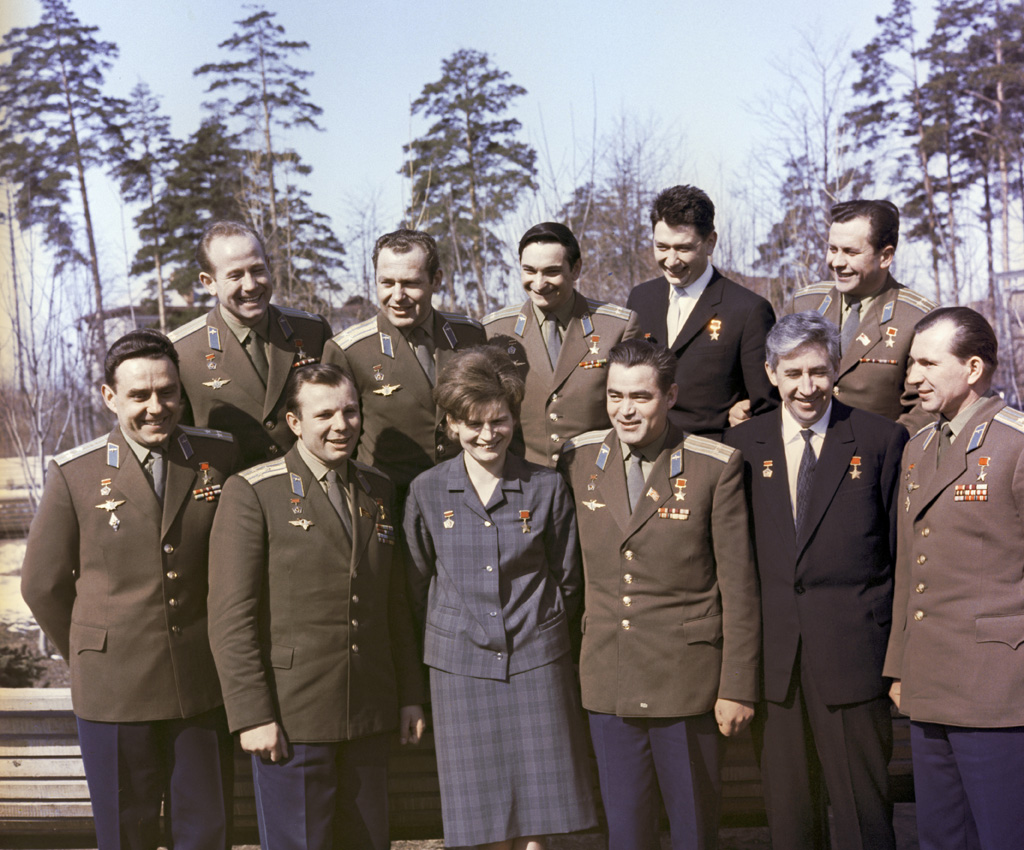
Alexei Leonov (far left, back row) with fellow cosmonauts in 1965

He was one of the 20 Soviet Air Forces pilots selected to be part of the first cosmonaut training group in 1960. As with most cosmonauts, Leonov was a member of the Communist Party of the Soviet Union. His walk in space was originally to have taken place on the Voskhod 1 mission, but this was cancelled, and the historic event happened on the Voskhod 2 flight instead. He was outside the spacecraft for 12 minutes and nine seconds on 18 March 1965, connected to the craft by a 4.8-metre (16 ft) tether. At the end of the spacewalk, Leonov's spacesuit had inflated in the vacuum of space to the point where he could not re-enter the airlock. He opened a valve to allow some of the suit's pressure to bleed off and was barely able to get back inside the capsule. While on the mission, Leonov drew a small sketch of an orbital sunrise, the first work of art made in outer space. Leonov had spent eighteen months undergoing weightlessness training for the mission.

In 1968, Leonov was selected to be commander of a circumlunar Soyuz 7K-L1 flight. This was cancelled because of delays in achieving a reliable circumlunar flight (only the later Zond 7 and Zond 8 members of the programme were successful) and the Apollo 8 mission had already achieved that step in the Space Race. He was also selected to be the first Soviet person to land on the Moon, aboard the LOK/N1 spacecraft. This project was also cancelled. (The design required a spacewalk between lunar vehicles, something that contributed to his selection.) Leonov was to have been commander of the 1971 Soyuz 11 mission to Salyut 1, the first crewed space station, but his crew was replaced with the backup after one of the members, cosmonaut Valery Kubasov, was suspected to have contracted tuberculosis (the other member was Pyotr Kolodin).

Leonov was to have commanded the next mission to Salyut 1, but this was scrapped after the deaths of the Soyuz 11 crew members, and the space station was lost. The next two Salyuts (actually the military Almaz station) were lost at launch or failed soon after, and Leonov's crew stood by. By the time Salyut 4 reached orbit, Leonov had been switched to a more prestigious project.

Leonov's second trip into space was as commander of Soyuz 19, the Soviet half of the 1975 Apollo-Soyuz mission—the first joint space mission between the Soviet Union and the United States. During the project Leonov became lasting friends with the US commander Thomas P. Stafford, with Leonov being the godfather of Stafford's younger children. Stafford gave a eulogy in Russian at Leonov's funeral in October 2019.

From 1976 to 1982, Leonov was the commander of the cosmonaut team ("Chief Cosmonaut") and deputy director of the Yuri Gagarin Cosmonaut Training Center, where he oversaw crew training. He also edited the cosmonaut newsletter Neptune. He retired in 1992.

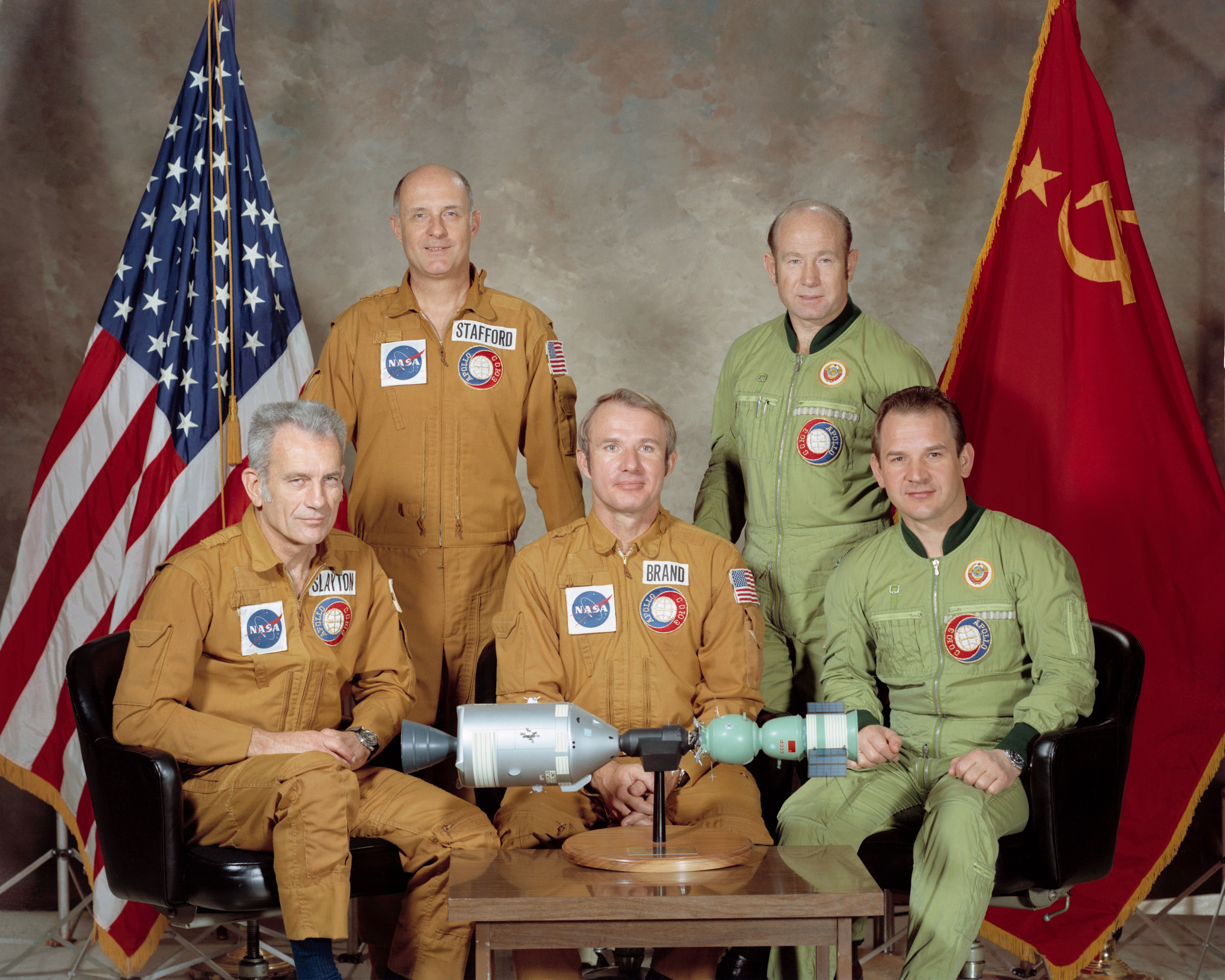
The Apollo-Soyuz crew in 1975

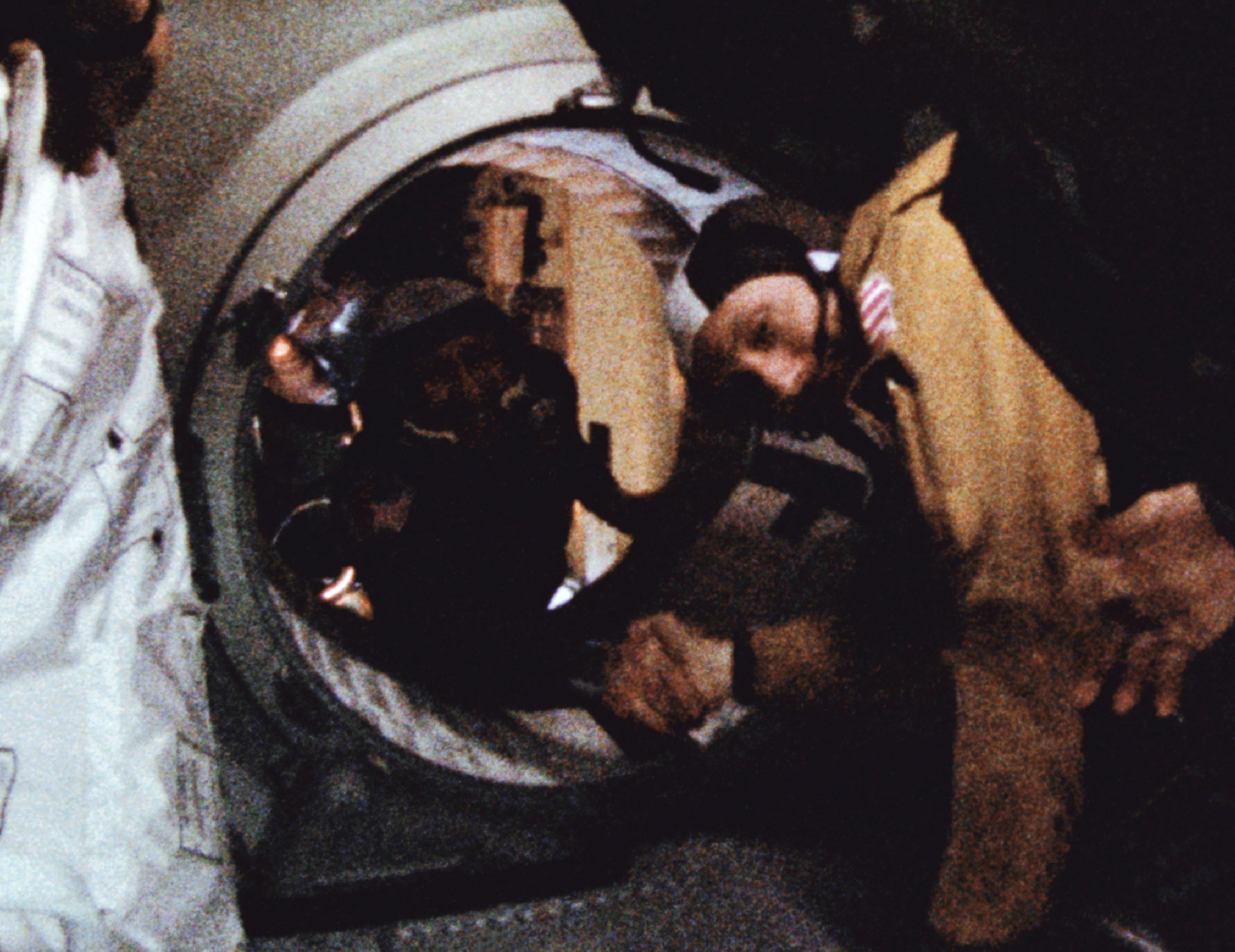
The historic handshake between Leonov and Tom Stafford

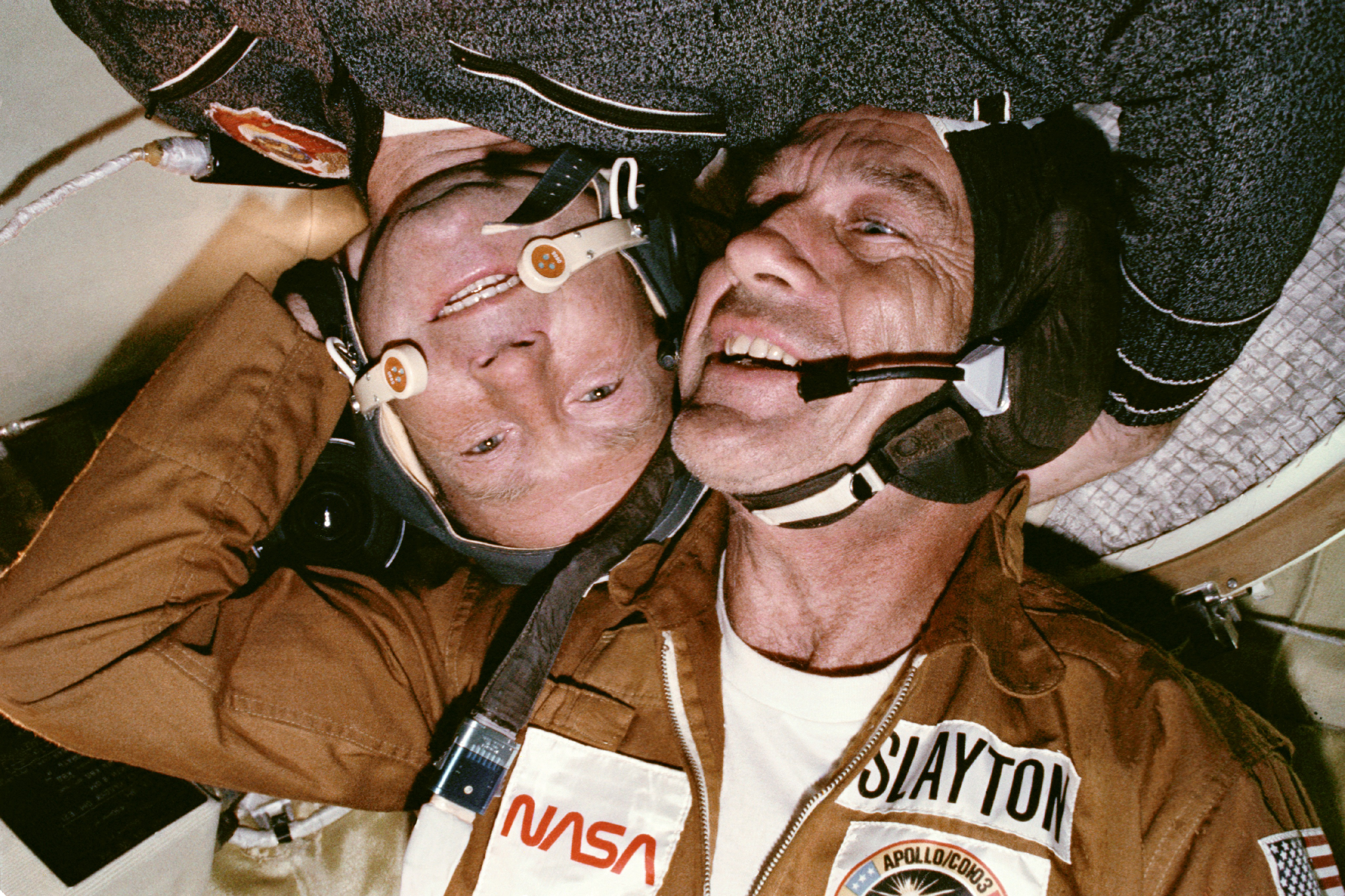
Leonov (left) with Deke Slayton in the Soyuz spacecraft

== Later life and death ==
Leonov's 1967 painting Near the Moon and a still from 2001: A Space Odyssey (1968)

Leonov was an accomplished artist whose published books include albums of his artistic works and works he did in collaboration with his friend Andrei Sokolov. Leonov took coloured pencils and paper into space, where he sketched the Earth, becoming the first artist in space, and drew portraits of the Apollo astronauts who flew with him during the 1975 Apollo–Soyuz Test Project.

Arthur C. Clarke wrote in his notes to his 1982 novel 2010: Odyssey Two that, after a 1968 screening of 2001: A Space Odyssey, Leonov pointed out to him that the alignment of the Moon, Earth, and Sun shown in the opening is essentially the same as that in Leonov's 1967 painting Near the Moon, although the painting's diagonal framing of the scene was not replicated in the film. Clarke kept an autographed sketch of this painting—which Leonov made after the screening—hanging on his office wall. Clarke dedicated 2010: Odyssey Two to Leonov and Soviet physicist Andrei Sakharov. The fictional spaceship in the book is named Cosmonaut Alexei Leonov.

Together with Valentin Selivanov, Leonov wrote the script for the 1980 science fiction film The Orion Loop.

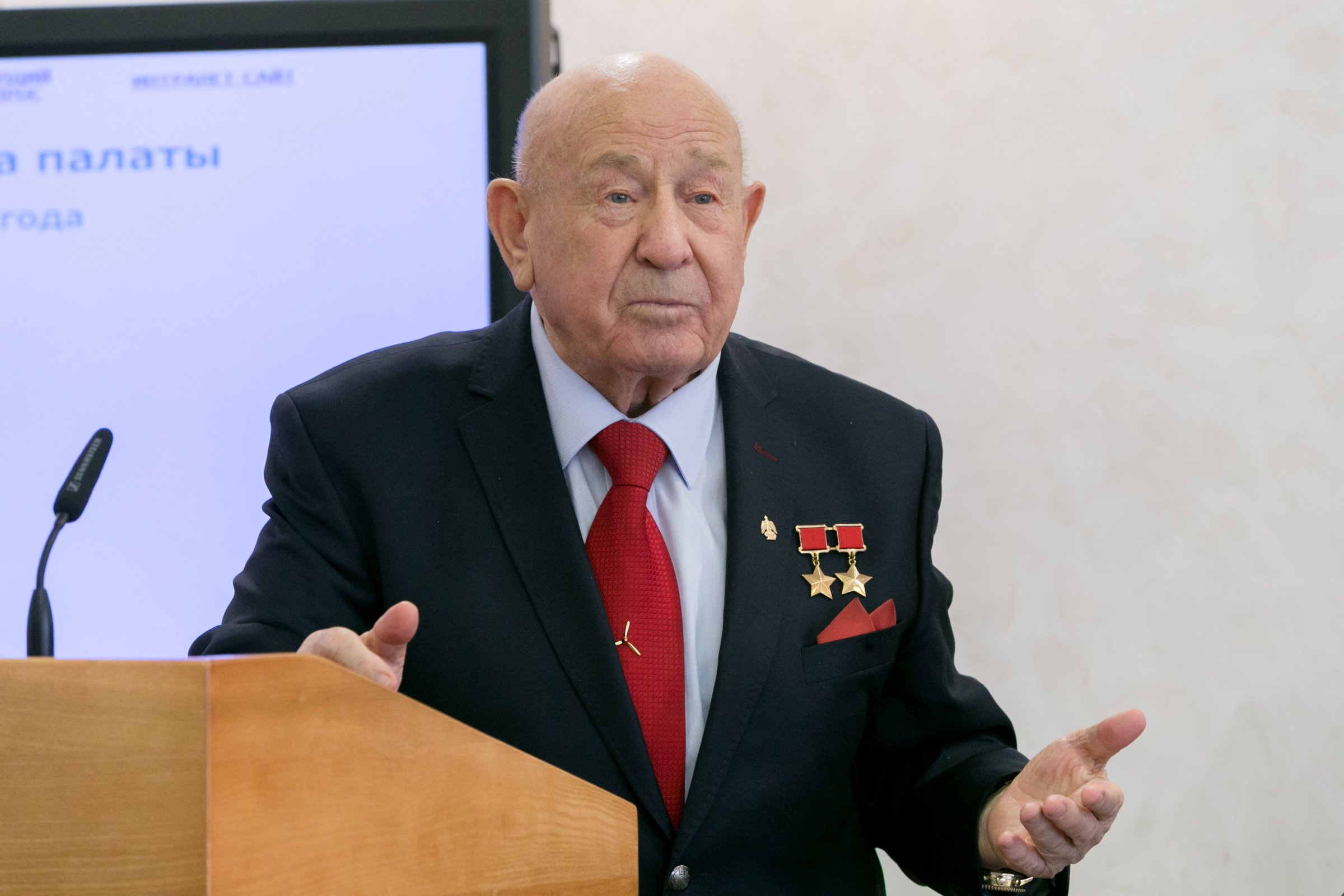
Leonov at a meeting in the Federation Council, 2016

Leonov was the head of the Banner of Peace in Space project from 1990 until his death.

Leonov retired in 1991 and lived in Moscow in his final years. He had been in reserve since March 1992. In 1992–1993, he was director of space programs at Chetek. Leonov was an advisor to the First Deputy Chairman of the Board of Directors of the Moscow-based Alfa-Bank, and in 2001, vice-president of Alfa-Bank. He was a member of the United Russia party since 18 December 2002 and a member of the party's Supreme Council. He received recognition as an artist (he collaborated with Andrei Sokolov), and his works are widely exhibited and published.

In 2004, Leonov and former American astronaut David Scott began work on a dual memoir covering the history of the Space Race between the United States and the Soviet Union. Titled Two Sides of the Moon: Our Story of the Cold War Space Race, it was published in 2006. Neil Armstrong and Tom Hanks both wrote introductions to the book.

Leonov was interviewed by Francis French for the 2007 book Into That Silent Sea by Colin Burgess and French.

Leonov died in Moscow on 11 October 2019 after a long illness. His funeral took place on 15 October. He was 85 and the last living member of the five cosmonauts in the Voskhod programme. He was survived by his wife Svetlana Dozenko, daughter Oksana, and two grandchildren; his other daughter, Viktoria, died in 1996.

== Legacy ==
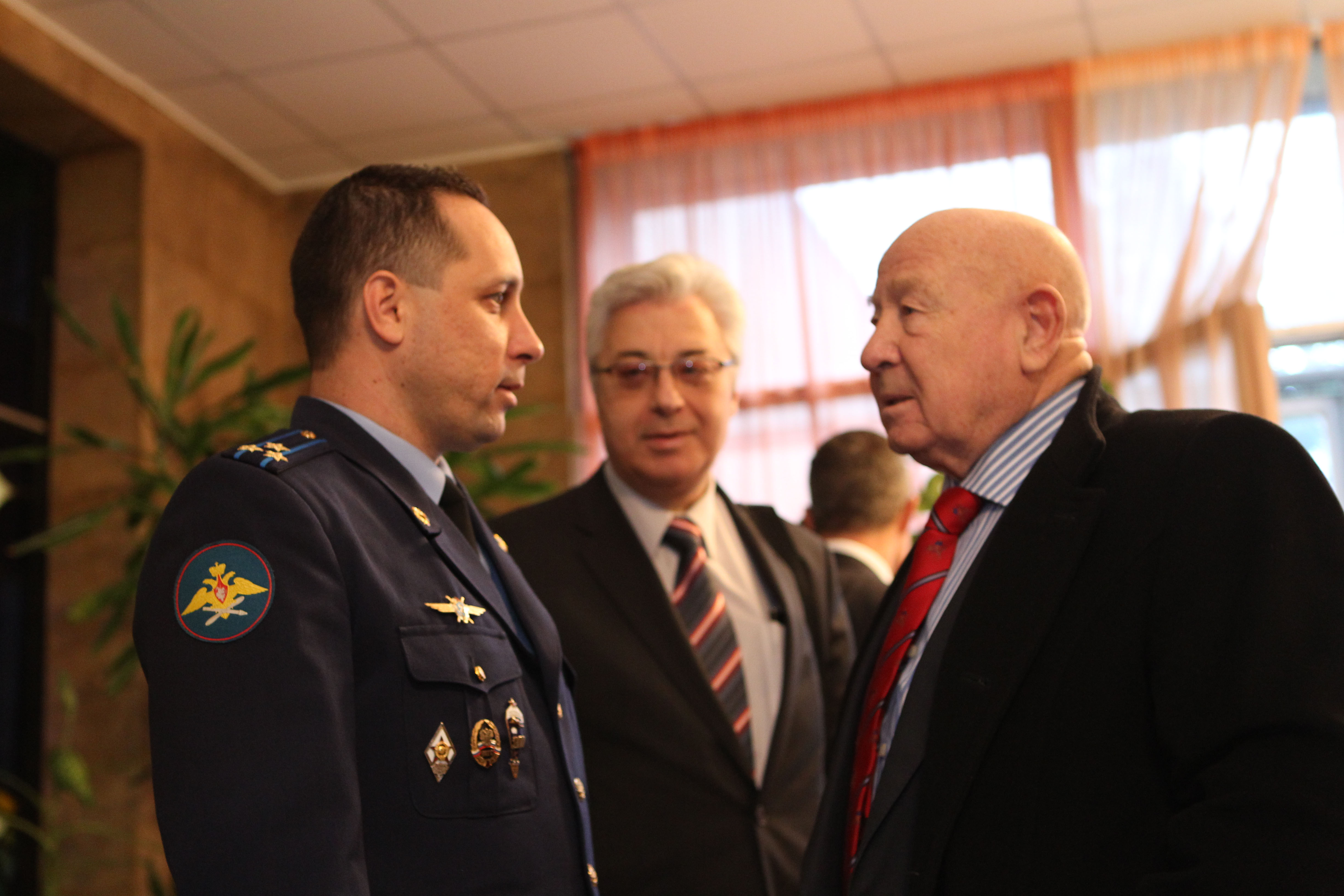
Alexei Leonov (right) shares a moment with Anton Shkaplerov (left) in October 2011.

- In 1966, in the town Balashov in the Saratov region, the A. A. Leonov School of Young Cosmonauts (школа юных космонавтов имени А. А. Леонова) was opened. Future pilots were trained in this school, and students learned to fly an airplane
- Worried about the Siberian wildlife, namely bears and wolves, while awaiting pick-up after landing, Alexei Leonov inspired the TP-82 Cosmonaut survival pistol, which was regularly carried by Cosmonaut expeditions from 1986 to 2007.
- The Leonov crater, near Mare Moscoviense (Sea of Moscow) on the far side of the Moon, was named after Leonov in 1970.
- 9533 Aleksejleonov, an asteroid first observed in 1981, was named for him.
- In the 1982 book 2010: Odyssey Two by Arthur C. Clarke the Soviet spaceship Alexei Leonov is named after the cosmonaut. The book is dedicated to Leonov and Andrei Sakharov.
- Leonov, along with Rusty Schweickart, established the Association of Space Explorers in 1985. Membership is open to all people who have orbited the Earth.
- Leonov created the image of Stephen Hawking for the medal, which was established by the Starmus Festival. Since 2015, it has been awarded for works contributing to the promotion of scientific knowledge in various fields, such as music, art, cinema. The portrait of Hawking painted by the astronaut is depicted on the front side of the "scientific Oscar". The reverse depicts Leonov's first spacewalk and Brian May's guitar, symbolizing the two main components of the festival. Leonov created the design for the reverse side in close cooperation with May.
- The 2017 film The Age of Pioneers (Russian: Vremya Pervykh) is based on Leonov's account of the Voskhod 2 mission. Leonov was portrayed by Yevgeny Mironov. He was a technical adviser for the movie; the director cut all scenes featuring Gagarin–about 40 minutes of film–so Leonov could be the focus.
- The song "E.V.A." by Public Service Broadcasting on their 2015 album, The Race for Space, references Leonov becoming the first man to undertake extravehicular activity in space.
- In the 2019 alternate history television series, For All Mankind and its 2026 spin-off Star City, Leonov is portrayed as the first person to walk on the Moon.
- Leonov, a 2020 album by BlackWeald, is a dark ambient interpretation of the Voskhod 2 mission.
- "Orbital Sunrise," an essay by John Green, focuses in part on the sketch Leonov made during his 1965 mission. It was released on 26 August 2021 as part of Green's podcast, The Anthropocene Reviewed. Later, it was posted separately on the YouTube channel vlogbrothers, and included in the Anthropocene Reviewed book.
- At the 2022 on Starmus festival, held for the first time in the post-Soviet space, in Armenia, the premiere of the documentary film "Space Inside" about Alexei Leonov took place. It was introduced by the cosmonaut's daughter, Oksana Leonova. It is based on the last interview of the pioneer.

=== Soviet/Russian awards and honours ===
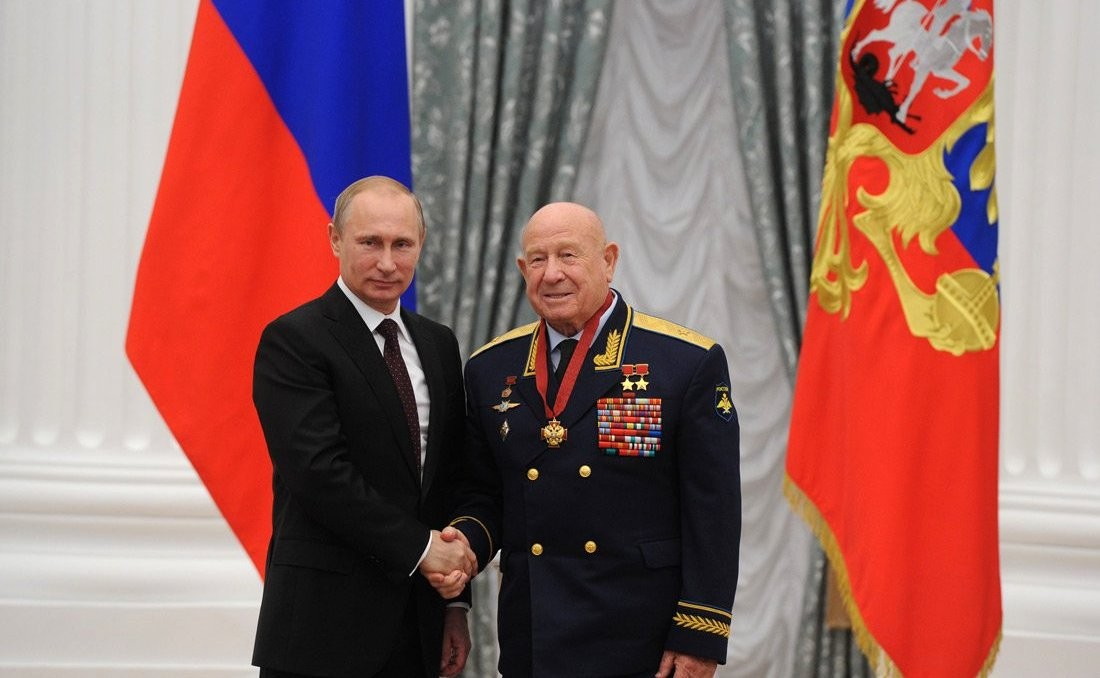
Leonov receiving the Order "For Merit to the Fatherland", 3rd class, from Vladimir Putin in 2014

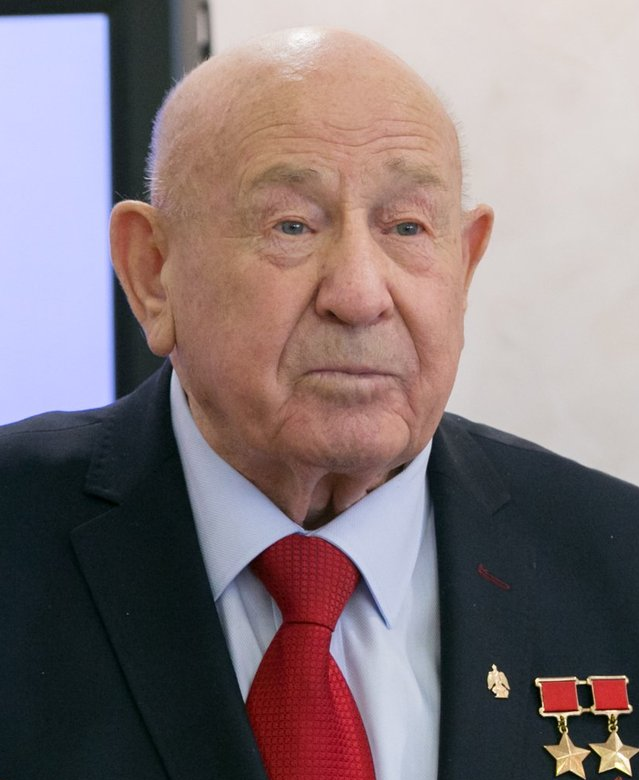
Leonov in 2016, wearing his two Hero of the Soviet Union medals

- Twice Hero of the Soviet Union (23 March 1965 and 22 July 1975)
- Two Orders of Lenin (23 March 1965 and 22 July 1975)
- Pilot-Cosmonaut of the USSR (1965)
- Merited Master of Sport of the USSR (1965)
- Order of the Red Star (1961)
- Order for Service to the Homeland in the Armed Forces of the USSR, 3rd class (1975)
- Jubilee Medal "Twenty Years of Victory in the Great Patriotic War 1941–1945"
- Jubilee Medal "40 Years of the Armed Forces of the USSR"
- Jubilee Medal "50 Years of the Armed Forces of the USSR"
- Jubilee Medal "60 Years of the Armed Forces of the USSR"
- Jubilee Medal "70 Years of the Armed Forces of the USSR"
- Medal "Veteran of the Armed Forces of the USSR"
- Medals "For Impeccable Service", 1st, 2nd and 3rd classes
- Lenin Komsomol Prize (1980)
- USSR State Prize (1981)
- Order for Merit to the Fatherland, 4th class (2 March 2000)
- Order of Friendship (12 April 2011)
- Order "For Merit to the Fatherland", 3rd class (22 May 2014)
- Order "For Merit to the Fatherland", 1st class (29 May 2019)

=== Foreign awards ===
- Hero of Socialist Labour (People's Republic of Bulgaria, 1965)
- Order of Georgi Dimitrov (People's Republic of Bulgaria, 1965)
- Artur Becker Medal (German Democratic Republic, 1965)
- Order of Karl Marx (German Democratic Republic, 1965)
- Order of the Flag of the Republic of Hungary (1965)
- Hero of Labor (Democratic Republic of Vietnam, 1966)
- Order of Civil Merit, 1st class (Syria, 1966)
- Order of Merit, 3rd class (Ukraine, 2011)

=== Public organizations ===
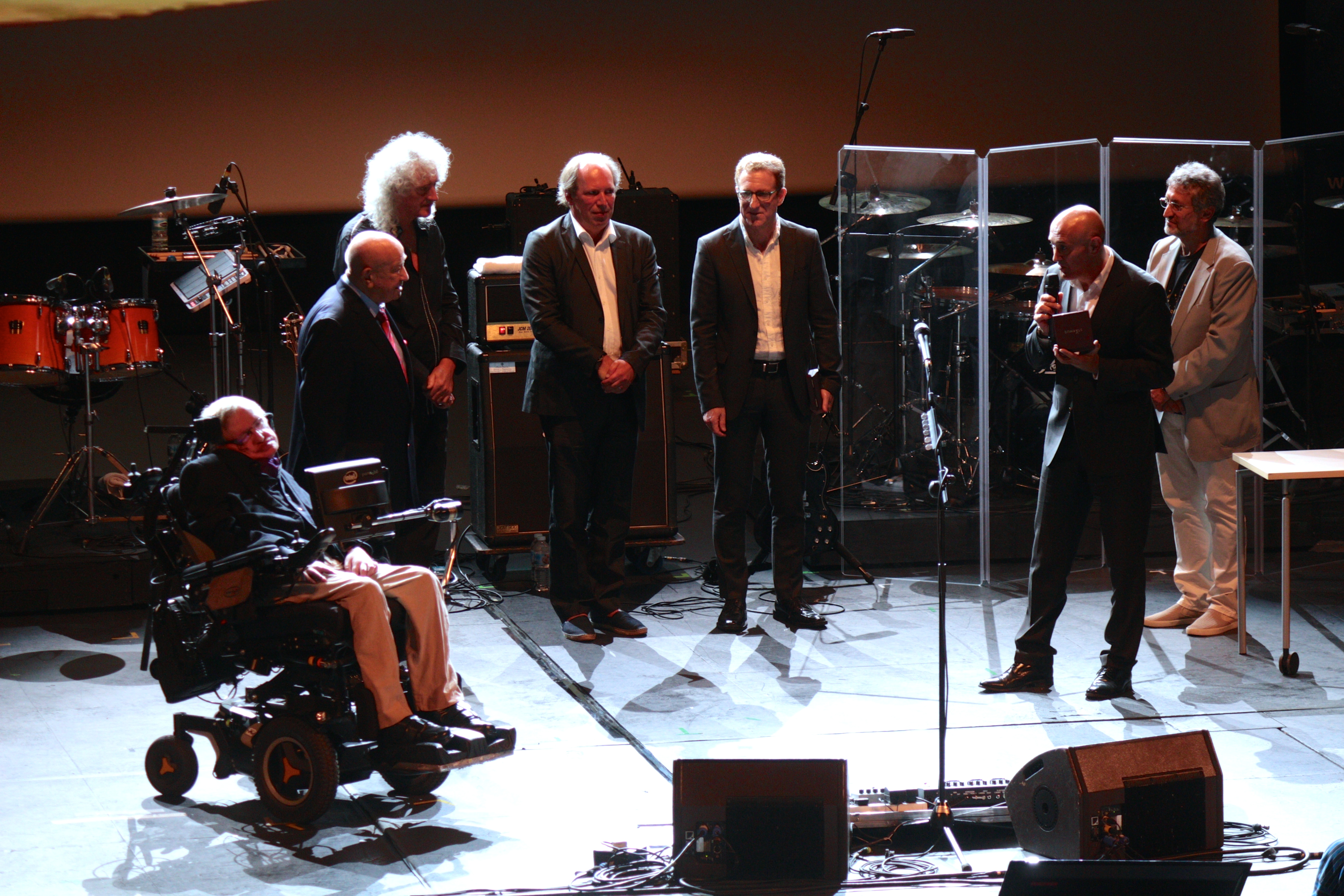
Leonov, Stephen Hawking, and Brian May at the Starmus Festival, 2016

- 1975 Gold Space Medal from the Fédération Aéronautique Internationale (FAI) in 1976. FAI created an exception which allowed Thomas P. Stafford to be awarded it alongside him; typically the award is restricted to one person per year.
- International Space Hall of Fame (1976)
- International Air & Space Hall of Fame, inducted in 2001, along with Valeri Kubasov, Vance D. Brand, Deke Slayton, and Thomas P. Stafford
- Ludwig Nobel Prize (2007)
- Elmer A. Sperry Award (US, 2008), with Konstantin Bushuyev, Thomas P. Stafford, and Glynn Lunney
- Order of Saint Constantine the Great (Union of the Golden Knights of the Order of St. Constantine the Great)
- Order "Golden Star" (Foundation Heroes of the Soviet Union and Heroes of the Russian Federation)
- Order the "Pride of Russia" (Foundation for the "Pride of the Fatherland", 2007)
- National Award "To the Glory of the Fatherland" in the "Glory to Russia" class (International Academy of Social Sciences and International Academy of patronage, 2008)
- Order of "the Glory of the Fatherland", 2nd class (2008)
- 2011 co-founder and the member of board of directors of the international festival of science, space and music Starmus together with astrophysicist Garik Israelyan, musician of the band Queen Brian May, scientist-educator Stephen Hawking, a number of astronauts and Nobel laureates.

=== Stamps ===
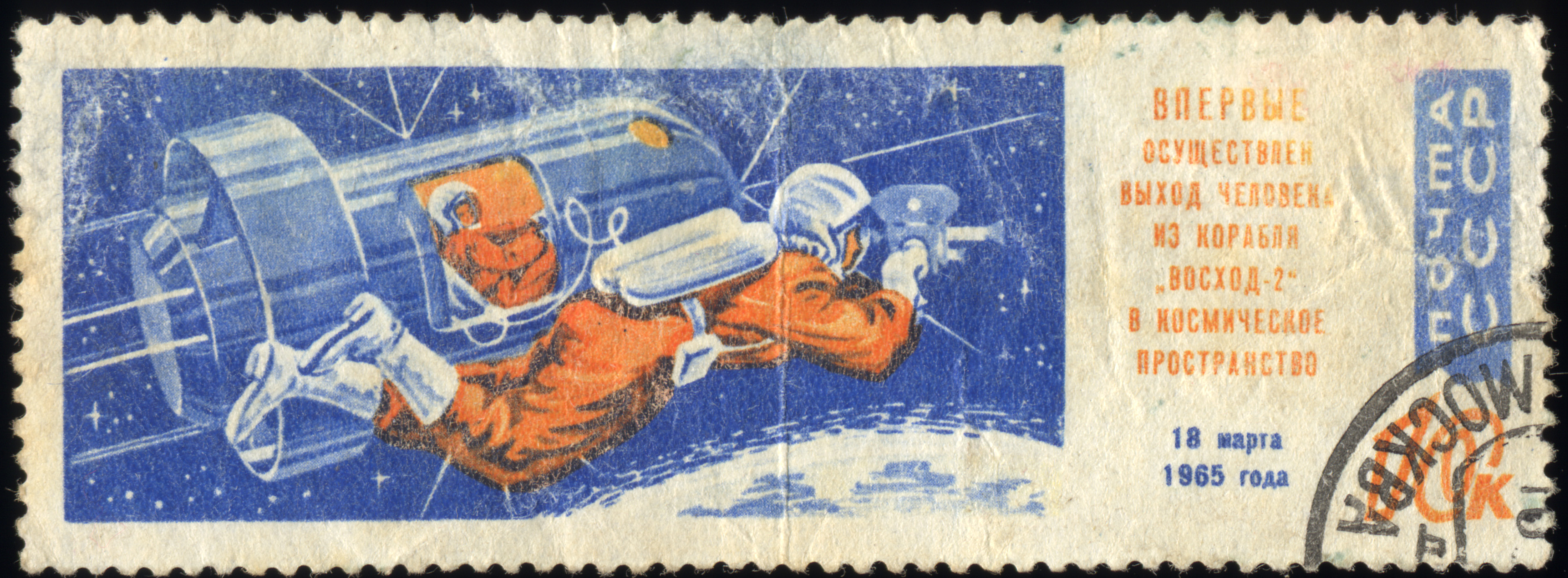
Alexei Leonov on 1965 USSR 10 kopek stamp

Leonov's accomplishments in space were honored with issuance of stamps by numerous countries.

- Alexey Leonov (first space walk) on Soviet Union stamp 10 kopeks (issued 1965)
- Space Flight of Voskhod 2 and Lt. Col. Alexei Leonov on Hungary (Magyar Posta) stamp (issued 1965)
- Apollo-Soyuz Test Project on Soviet Union 50 kopeks stamp (issued 1975)
- 50th anniversary of first space walk on Solomon Islands stamp $12 (issued 2015)

=== Other awards and titles ===
- Commander of the Order of Saint Anna III degree (2008), by Grand Duchess Maria Vladimirovna of Russia
- Commander of the Order of Saint Anna II degree (2011), by Grand Duchess Maria Vladimirovna of Russia
- Honorary member of the Russian Academy of Arts

== See also ==
- Attempted assassination of Leonid Brezhnev (Moscow, 1969), in which a gunman fired 14 shots at a limousine carrying Leonov and other cosmonauts.

== Sources ==
- Burgess, Colin; Hall, Rex (2009). The First Soviet Cosmonaut Team: Their Lives and Legacies. Springer Science & Business Media. ISBN 978-0-387-84824-2.
- Dicati, Renato (10 January 2017). Stamping the Earth from Space. Springer. ISBN 978-3-319-20756-8.
- French, Francis; Burgess, Colin (2007). Into That Silent Sea: Trailblazers of the Space Era, 1961–1965. University of Nebraska Press. ISBN 978-0-8032-2639-5.
- Hall, Rex; Shayler, David (2003). Soyuz: A Universal Spacecraft. London: Springer. ISBN 978-1-85233-657-8. OCLC 840379365.
- Harland, David M.; Catchpole, John E. (6 February 2002). Creating the International Space Station. Springer. ISBN 978-1-85233-202-0.
- Ritchie, Eleanor H. (1984). Astronautics and Aeronautics, 1976: A Chronology. NASA.
- Scott, David; Leonov, Alexei (2004). Two Sides of the Moon: Our Story of the Cold War Space Race. with Christine Toomey. New York: St. Martin's Griffin. ISBN 978-0-312-30866-7.
