= Komarov (crater) =

Crater on the Moon

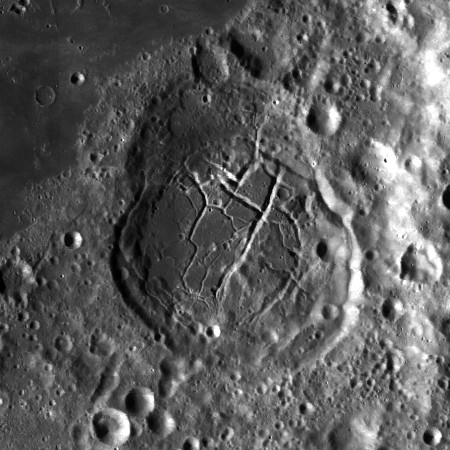
- LRO image
- Coordinates: 24.7°N 152.5°E
- Diameter: 78 km
- Depth: Unknown
- Colongitude: 209° at sunrise
- Eponym: Vladimir Komarov

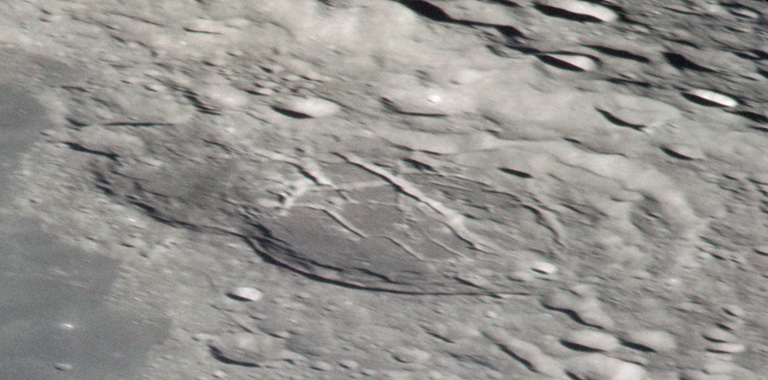
Oblique Apollo 13 image

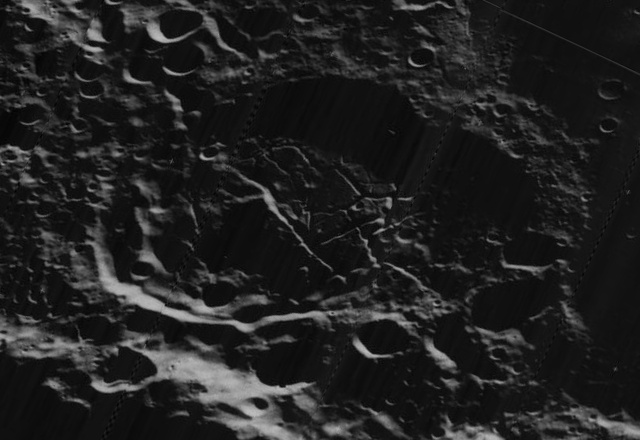
Oblique Lunar Orbiter 5 image

Komarov is a lunar impact crater that lies across the southeastern edge of Mare Moscoviense, on the northern hemisphere of the far side of the Moon. It is a complex feature with an irregular appearance.

The northern rim of Komarov bulges outwards into the mare, giving the crater a pear shape. The regions around the northeastern and southern rims are rugged and uneven, and the crater floor in between has been resurfaced by lava flows that have completely submerged the western third of the interior. This surface is marked by a pattern of multiple rilles that run primarily in a north–south direction, but are cracked like a drying mud bed. Along the interior of the eastern rim is a cleft-like formation that curves along the inner rim. The northwestern rim has an outer rampart where it slopes down to the plain of the neighboring mare.

The crater is named after Soviet cosmonaut Vladimir Komarov (1927–1967).
