= Mare Moscoviense =

Lunar mare on the far side of the Moon

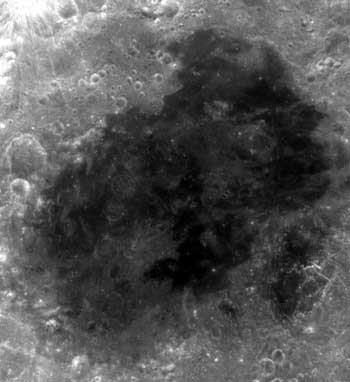
- Mare Moscoviense
- Coordinates: 27.3°N 147.9°E
- Diameter: 276 km
- Eponym: Sea of Muscovy

Mare Moscoviense (Latin for 'Sea of Moscovy'; /ˌmɒskəviˈɛnsi/ MOSK-ə-vee-EN-see) is a lunar mare that sits in the Moscoviense basin. It is one of the very few maria on the far side of the Moon.

== Geology ==
Like Mare Marginis, this mare appears to be fairly thin. However, it is clearly centered within a large impact basin. It is also much lower than either the outer basin floor or the farside highlands.

The great depth of this mare beneath the nearby highlands probably explains why mare units are so rare on the lunar farside. Very few basins on the farside were deep enough to allow mare volcanism. Thus, while large impact basins are found on both the nearside and farside, large maria are mostly found on the nearside. Mare lavas apparently could reach the surface more often and more easily there. The basin material is of the Nectarian epoch, while the mare material is of the Upper Imbrian epoch. Following the SELENE mission, scientists proposed that volcanism in Mare Moscoviense was active for at least 1.5 billion years following the formation of the Moscoviense basin, but the formation of the mare as the result of a meteorite cluster impact, rather than from volcanism, has also been proposed based on the energy required to melt the lava in Mare Moscoviense.

At the center of the basin (or the southwest portion of the mare) is a mascon, or gravitational high. The mascon was first identified by Doppler tracking of the Lunar Prospector spacecraft.

== Name ==
The name Mare Moscoviense was approved by the IAU in 1961. It is Latin for "sea of Muscovy".

Lunar naming conventions specify that lunar maria are named in Latin after 'weather and other abstract concepts', with a few exceptions. Mare Moscoviense was discovered in 1959, when the first images of the far side were returned by the Soviet spacecraft Luna 3. The name was proposed by the Soviet Union, but was only accepted by the International Astronomical Union when Audouin Dollfus argued that Moscow is a state of mind.

== Gallery ==
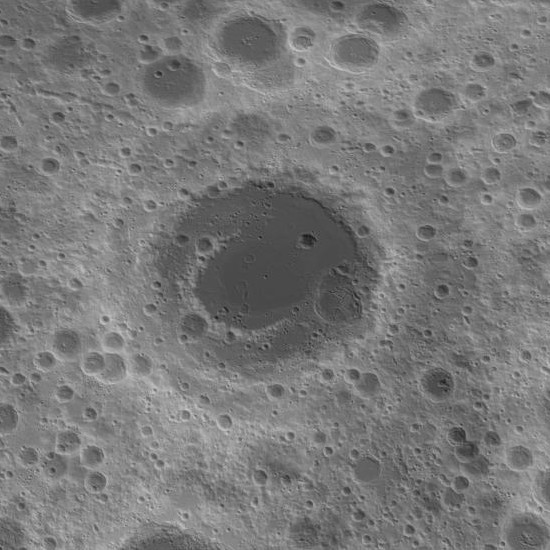
Topographic map

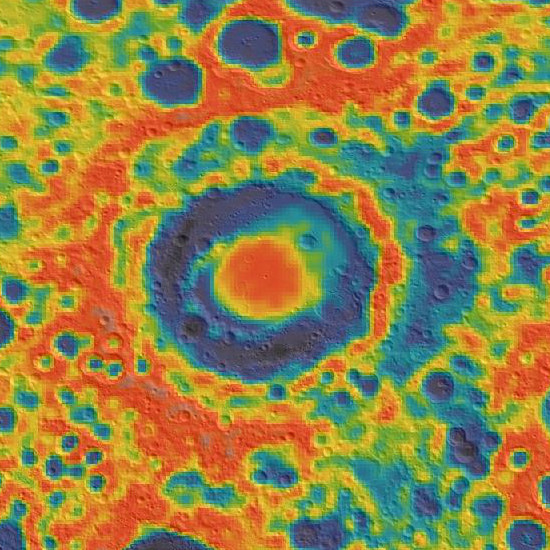
Gravity map based on GRAIL

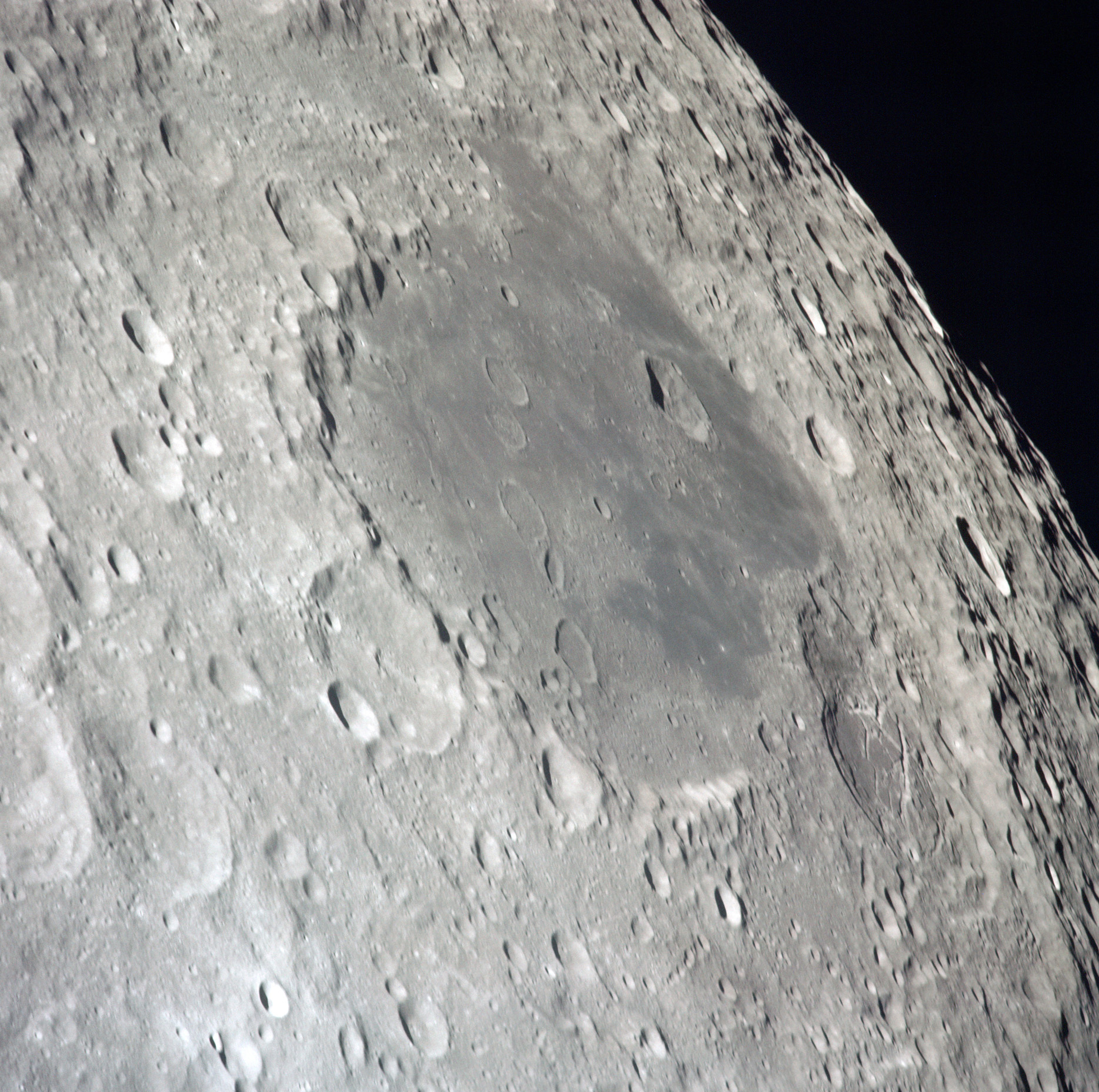
Mare Moscoviense from Apollo 13
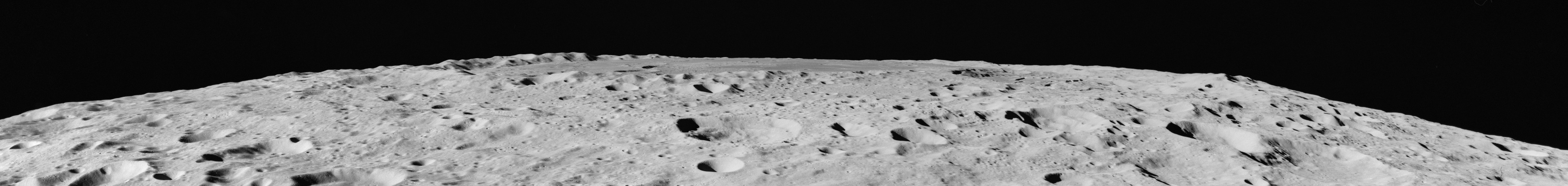
Oblique view from Apollo 16, with the mare at the horizon. The outer basin rings are subtle but visible in this view.

== Nearby features ==
The crater Titov is in the northeastern region of the mare, and Tereshkova lies along the northern edge. The floor-fractured crater Komarov lies on the southeast edge of the mare. The Korolev basin is to the southeast of the mare, and the Freundlich-Sharonov Basin is to the east. Leonov (crater), named for cosmonaut Alexei Leonov, lies just to the south of Mare Moscoviense.
