= Starmus Festival =

Annual science festival

Starmus
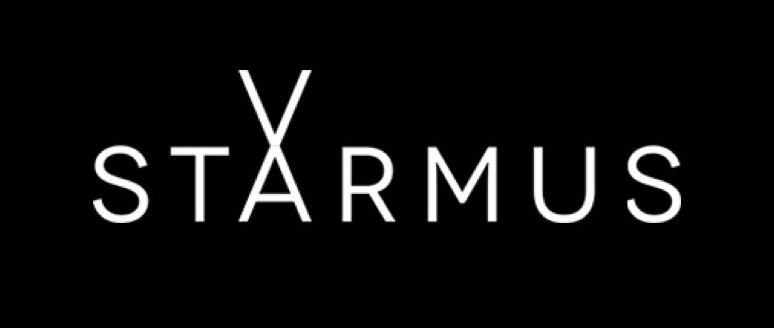
- Formation: 2007; 19 years ago
- Founder: Garik Israelian; Brian May
- Purpose: Educational, events
- Products: Festivals
- Fields: Science, astronomy
- Website: starmus.com

The Starmus International Festival is an international gathering focused on celebrating astronomy, space exploration, music, art, and the natural sciences. It was founded by astronomer / amateur musician Garik Israelian and musician / astrophysicist Brian May. The festival has featured multiple well-known astronauts and astronomers.

== Festivals ==
=== 2011 ===
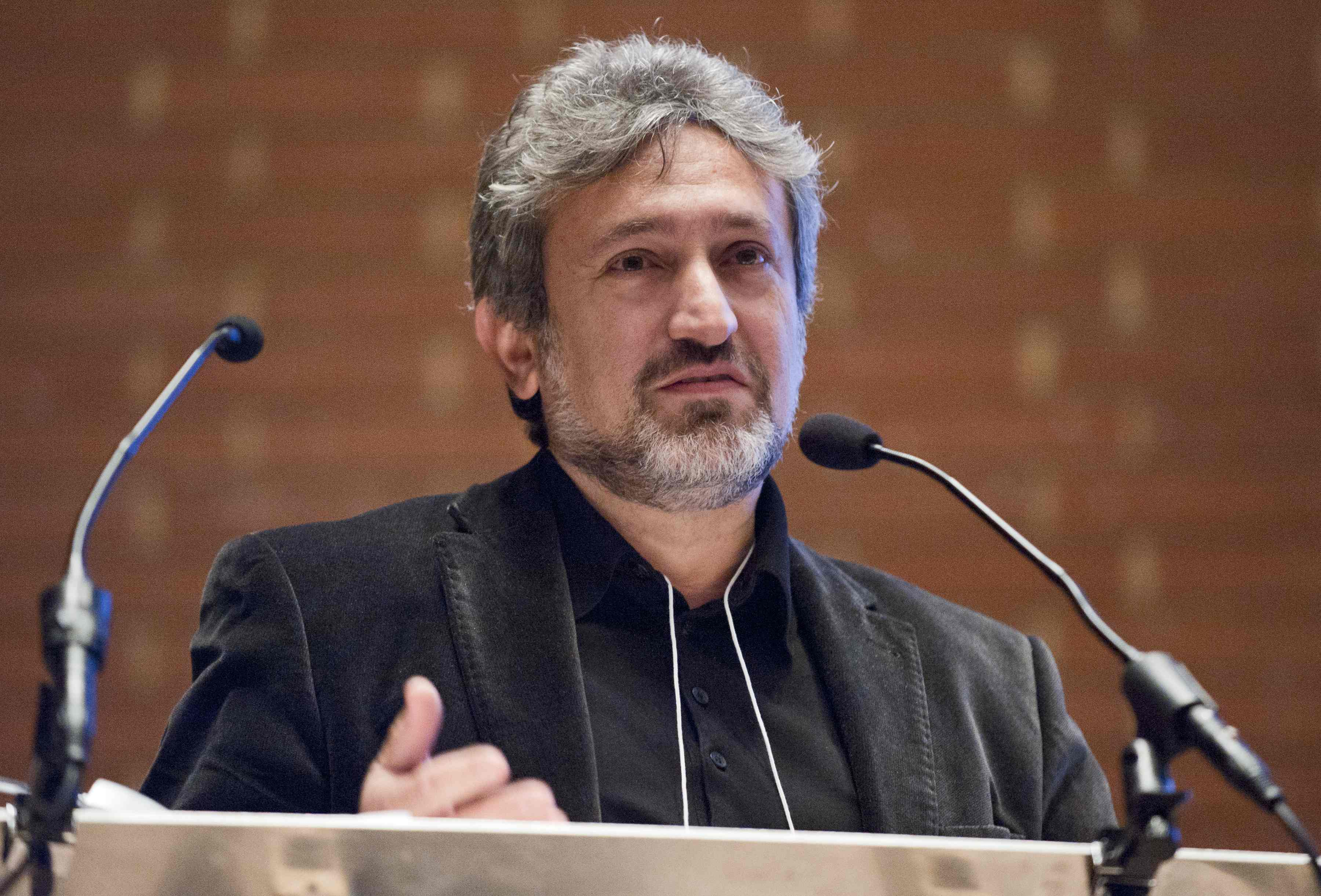
Founder Garik Israelian speaking at Starmus I

The first festival took place from 20 to 25 June 2011 on Tenerife and La Palma, Canary Islands, with the theme "50 Years of Man in Space." In 2014, the book Starmus: 50 Years of Man in Space was published covering the content of the festival.

=== 2014 ===
The second festival occurred 22 to 27 September 2014, on Tenerife and La Palma, Canary Islands with the theme "Beginnings: The Making of the Modern Cosmos." The Government of Tenerife announced that the equivalent publicity value from Starmus Festival II (2014) exceeds 170 million euros and that the festival reached 2.4 billion people worldwide.

=== 2016 ===
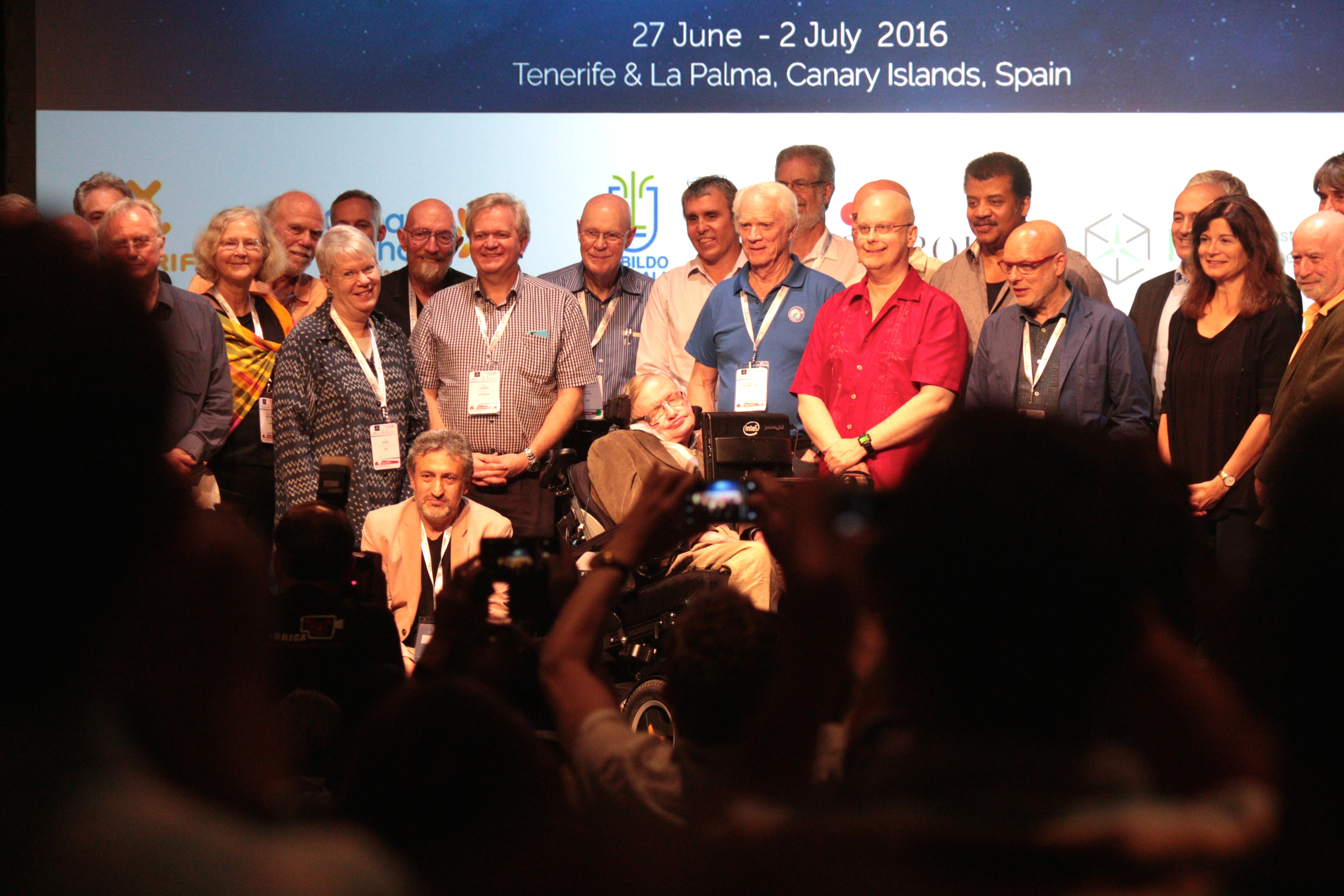
Participants at Starmus III, including Stephen Hawking

The third festival took place in the Canary Islands, on Tenerife and La Palma from 27 June to 2 July 2016 with the theme of "Beyond The Horizon: A Tribute To Stephen Hawking". The festival featured numerous scientists and science communicators including Stephen Hawking, Brian Cox, Richard Dawkins, Brian May, and 11 Nobel laureates.

Starmus III held the inaugural awards ceremony for recipients of the Stephen Hawking Medal for Science Communication. The award recipients (chosen by Hawking himself) were composer Hans Zimmer, physicist Jim Al-Khalili and the science documentary Particle Fever.

=== 2017 ===
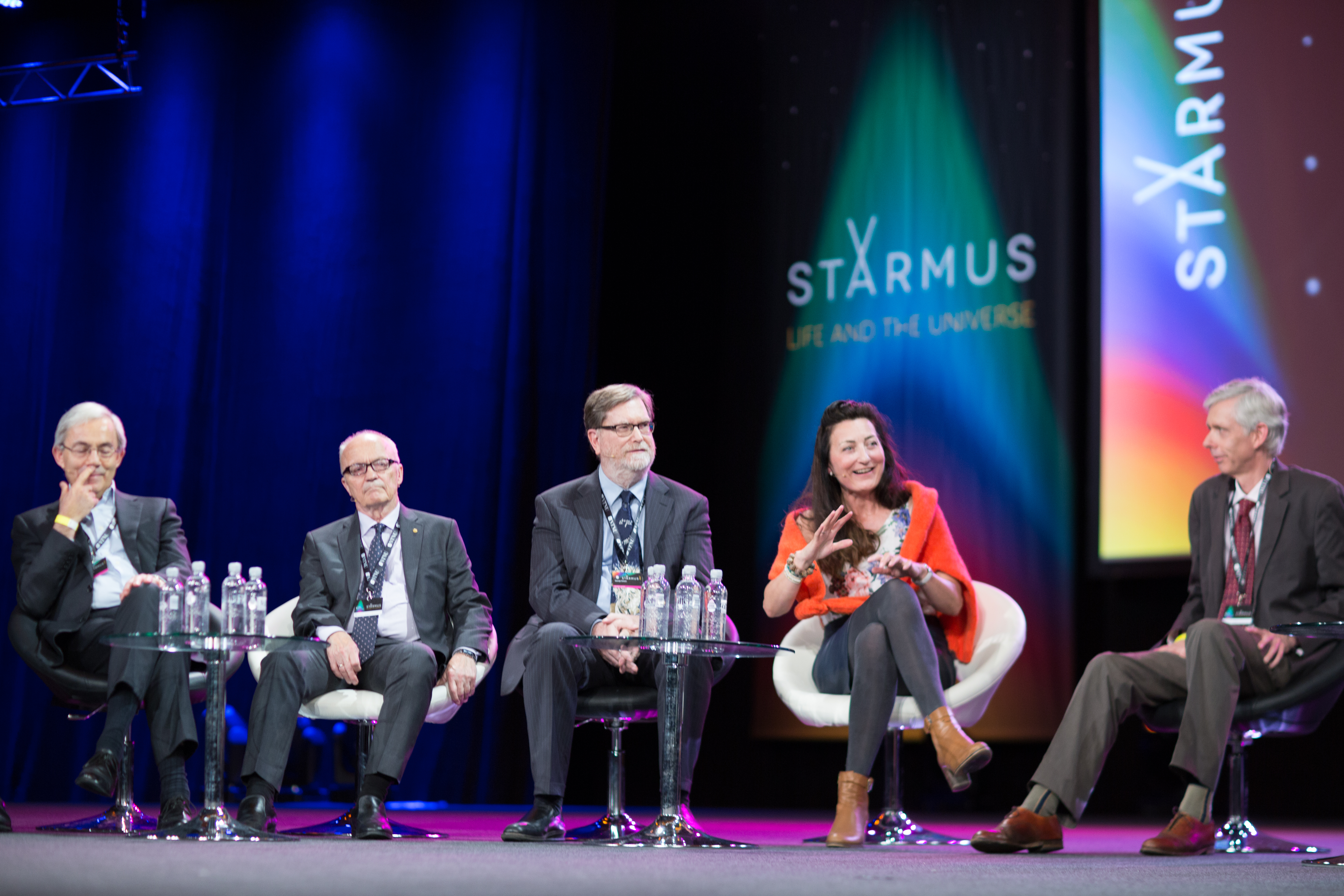
Nobel Prize laureates, Starmus IV

The fourth festival took place in Trondheim, Norway, from 18 to 23 June 2017 with the theme of "Life and the Universe". The festival featured eleven Nobel Prize laureates and many astronomers, biologists, chemists, economists, astronauts and artists.

The Stephen Hawking Medal award winners were Neil deGrasse Tyson (science writing), Jean-Michel Jarre (music and arts) and The Big Bang Theory (films).

=== 2019 ===
The fifth festival took place in Zurich, Switzerland in June 2019 under the theme "A Giant Leap", dedicated to the first step of the man on the Moon. Coinciding with the 50th anniversary of Apollo 11 landing on the Moon. The Stephen Hawking Medal was awarded to Elon Musk, Buzz Aldrin, Brian Eno and the documentary Apollo 11, screened during the festival for the first time in Europe.

=== 2022 ===
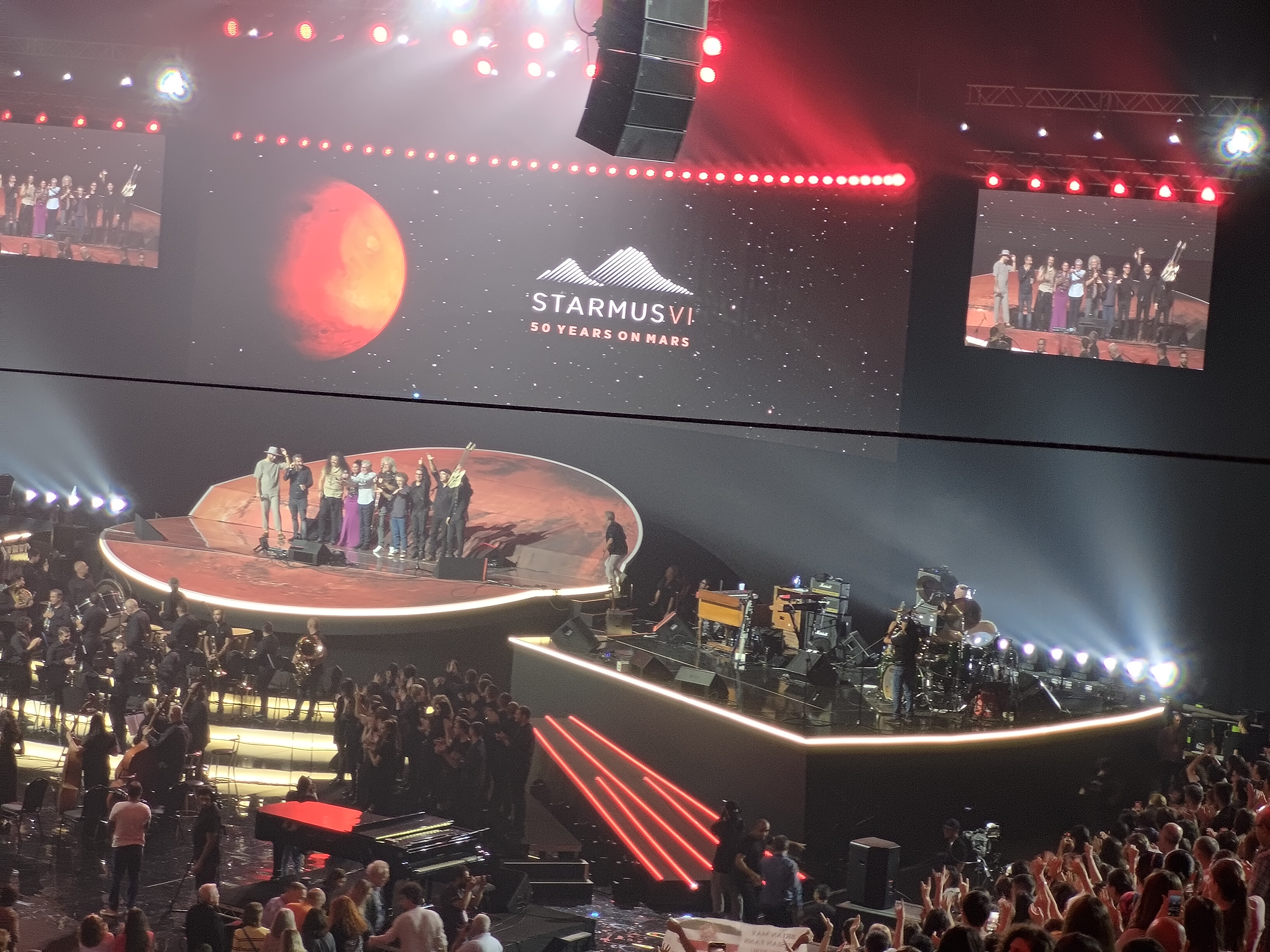
Another World Concert, Starmus VI

The sixth Starmus festival took place 5–11 September 2022 in Yerevan, Armenia with the theme 50 Years on Mars, dedicated to the 50th anniversary of the first landing on Mars. There were opening ceremonies and a concert on the first day. Around 50 scientists, Nobel laureates, engineers, cosmonauts, musicians and artists took part in festival events. Starmus VI hosted a Science Camp "to enable children and people interested in science to more closely get acquainted with the latest scientific and technological achievements."

Premiering at the festival was the documentary film Space Inside about the Soviet and Russian cosmonaut Alexei Leonov. The 80-minute film is based on Leonov's last interview and includes footage from the Soviet history of space exploration. A composition dedicated to the topic of Mars exploration was performed at the closing of the festival; the neo-symphony "March of Mars" by Tigran Jager.

Winners of the Stephen Hawking Medal were announced as Brian May, Jane Goodall, Diane Ackerman and the NASA Communications Unit.

=== 2024 ===
The seventh festival took place 12 to 17 May 2024 in Bratislava, Slovakia with the theme "The Future Of Our Home Planet". A concert on the first day featured performances by Jean-Michel Jarre and Brian May, light and laser displays, and a drone ballet for an audience of 100,000 by the SNP bridge. They were accompanied by the musicians Claude Samard, Adiescar Chase, Slovak Philharmonic Orchestra and Slovak Philharmonic Choir.

Some famous expert speakers of the festival programme were anthropologist Jane Goodall, Nobel Prize winners Michel Mayor, Emmanuelle Charpentier and Kip Thorne, and former astronauts Charlie Duke, Chris Hadfield, Kathryn Thornton and Garrett Reisman.

The Stephen Hawking Medal for Science Communication was awarded to Laurie Anderson, Christopher Nolan, David Attenborough and Sylvia Earle.

=== 2025 ===
In 2025, Starmus Festival returned to La Palma, Canary Islands, under the title “The Island of the Stars”, from 25 to 28 April. This edition emphasized the protection of the night sky, including challenges such as light pollution and space debris, and was part of the island’s recovery after the 2021 Cumbre Vieja volcanic eruption. The program featured over 45 prominent speakers—among them Nobel laureates, astronauts, scientists, and conservationists such as Jane Goodall. Events were held in various towns across La Palma, including Santa Cruz de La Palma, Los Llanos de Aridane, Puerto de Tazacorte, and Puerto Naos, with scientific expos and interactive “STARMUS Camps,” keynote lectures, concerts like “Sonic Universe” and a “Classical Night”.

== Sonic Universe Concerts ==
Two Sonic Universe Concerts were held at the Magma Arte & Congresos arena in Tenerife. The 2011 concert was recorded and produced into a CD entitled Starmus - Sonic Universe. The rock band Nosound recorded their 2014 concert performance and produced a CD/DVD set entitled Teide 2390.

== See also ==
- Stephen Hawking Medal for Science Communication
