= Garik Israelian =

Armenian-Spanish astrophysicist

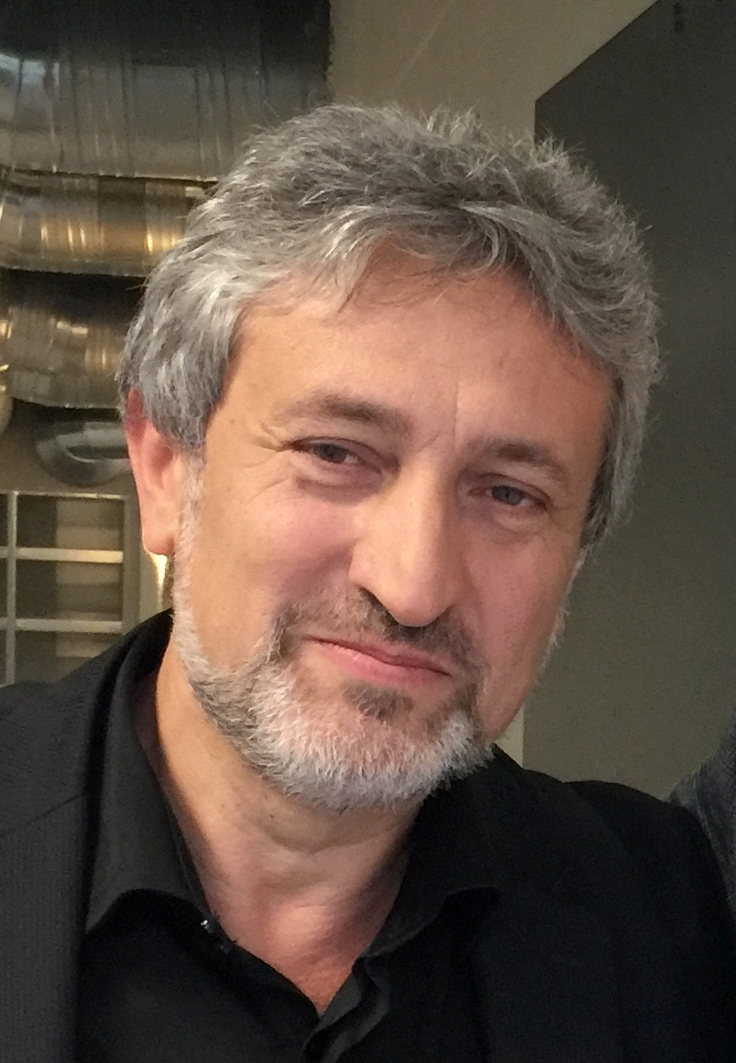
- Born: 1963 (age 62–63); Yerevan, Armenia
- Education: Yerevan State University
- Awards: Viktor Ambartsumian International Prize (2010), The Canary Islands Gold Medal (2014)
- Scientific career
- Fields: Astrophysics, Spectroscopy
- Workplaces: Instituto de Astrofisica de Canarias

Garik Israelian (Armenian: Գարիկ Իսրայելյան, born 1963) is an Armenian-Spanish astrophysicist and co-founder of the Starmus Festival. In 1999, Israelian and colleagues presented the first observational evidence that supernova explosions were responsible for the formation of stellar-mass black holes.

== Early life and education ==
Garik Israelian was born in 1963 in Yerevan in then-Soviet Armenia. Preferring music over studying, he quit school at the age of 16, playing rock guitar in bars. Israelian credits sci-fi film Solaris for piquing his interest in science fiction and inspiring him to go to university. He studied astrophysics under Viktor Ambartsumian at Yerevan State University, graduating in 1987 and completing his Ph.D. in 1992. After a brief stint with an observatory in Northern Ireland and fellowships in Netherlands, Belgium and Australia, his final fellowship settled him in the Canary Islands in 1997 where he stayed and obtained Spanish citizenship.

== Career ==
Israelian has worked at the Institute of Astrophysics, Canary Islands (IAC) since 1997. In 1999, Israelian and colleagues found the first observational evidence, based on data from the W. M. Keck Observatory, that supernova explosions are responsible for the formation of black holes.

In 2001, he proposed the "Lithium-6 test" to determine if a star has engulfed a planet or other gaseous or solid matter. He and collaborators proposed that a solar-type star HD82943 with two giant planets has swallowed a massive planet or a large amount of small rocky matter.

In 2009, he and colleagues discovered that stars with planets, such as the sun, tend to have much less lithium.

=== Starsounds and Starmus ===
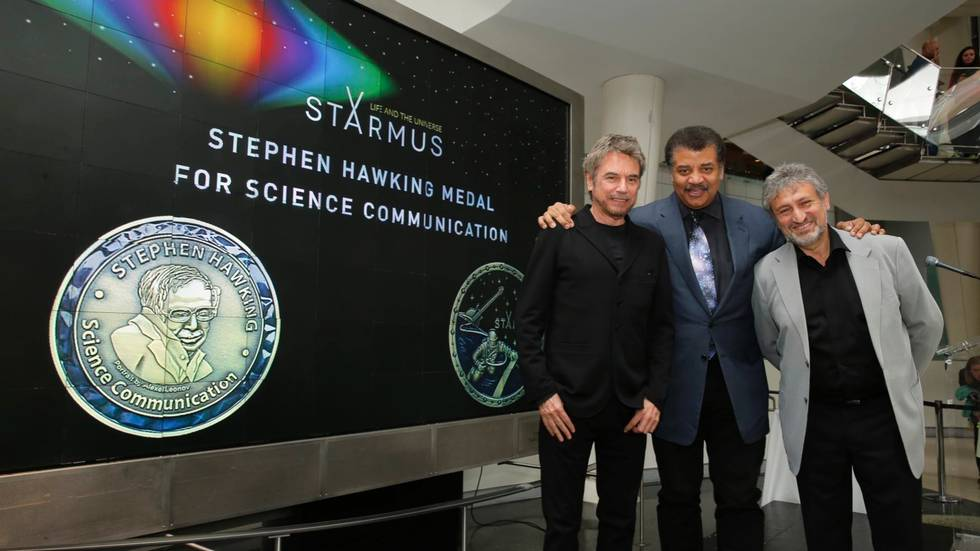
Garik Israelian (on right) with Jean Michel Jarre and Neil deGrasse Tyson at Hyden Planetarium (2017)

In 2005, Israelian compiled a library of acoustic sound waves produced within the bodies of stars.

In 2011, together with astrophysicist and musician Brian May, Israelian created the Starmus Festival, to bring together the stars and music. The concept of the Starsounds project was explained in Israelian's lecture "Our Acoustic Universe" at the first Starmus Festival and published in 2014 in the book Starmus: 50 Years of Man in Space.

At the first Starmus Festival, May and the band Tangerine Dream used the starsounds in their live performance of "Supernova", which opened a two-hour set, released on CD and digitally in 2013. In 2016 Brian Eno arranged some of Israelian's star recordings into a composition titled "Starsounds".

In a 2016 Larry King Now interview along with Stephen Hawking, Israelian explained the Starmus project and how he viewed music and arts as a natural way to inspire youth in science and astronomy — "I always thought that science inspired art, and art inspired science".

== Awards ==
In 2010, Michel Mayor, Nobel laureate in Physics, Israelian, and Nuno Santos were awarded the Viktor Ambartsumian International Prize "[f]or their important contribution in the study of relation between planetary systems and their host stars."

In 2014, Israelian received The Canary Islands Gold Medal, awarded by the government of the Canary Islands.

On 20 June 2016, the International Astronomical Union and the Minor Planet Center officially renamed asteroid (21057) 1991 GJ8 to Garikisraelian in honor of Israelian.
