= 2suit =

Garment designed to facilitate sex in weightless environments

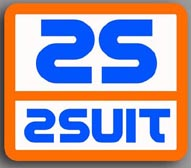
Logo emblem designating spacesuit functionality as a 2suit

The 2suit (alternately 2-Suit or twosuit) (abbrv. 2S) is a garment designed to facilitate sex in weightless environments. It has been tested in microgravity during a parabolic flight.

== History ==
Mission patch: pioneering human intimacy in space. "The 2suit is one small step for humankind colonizing the universe." History Channel, The Universe: Sex in Space

The 2Suit was invented by Vanna Bonta in 2006 after she experienced microgravity during a parabolic flight that she flew with the National Space Society in 2004. Bonta presented the garment design in 2006 on a panel at a New Space conference of the Space Frontier Foundation.

In 2008, the first 2Suit was manufactured and tested by a History Channel documentary for the television series The Universe. The episode premiered on December 3, 2008.

The documentary described the 2Suit as "one small step for humankind colonizing the universe." The garment was presented as a utilitarian garment with multiple applications that serves the need for human intimacy and procreation by stabilizing physical proximity in microgravity environments.

Prototype sketch of the 2Suit (MSNBC)

== Design ==
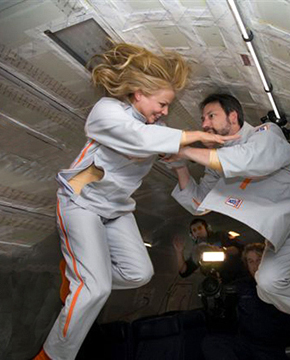
Vanna Bonta testing the 2suit in microgravity during a parabolic flight on September 13, 2008 (History Channel, The Universe)

The 2suit is a flight suit with a large front flap that can be opened and attached to another 2suit via Velcro strips.

The 2suit is equipped to fasten to a stable surface. The roominess within the garment is adjustable from within. It also is lined with inner harnesses that can adjust the proximity of various points of the wearer's body to the body of another 2suit wearer. A quick-disrobe function removes the garments, optionally leaving the harnesses in place for fixing to a stable surface.

== Function and purpose ==
The function of the 2suit is to allow two or more people to remain in proximity effortlessly in weightless or microgravity environments, permitting physical intimacy and facilitating tandem or adjacent tasks.

== References in popular culture ==
Future simulation: mother-to-be in space lounge wears a 2suit while relaxing. (The Universe, Sex in Space; History Channel)

The 2Suit has been mentioned in travel and exploration magazines as part of articles on subject like the "400 mile high club."

The 2Suit was discussed as fashion in WIRED and Discovery Magazine, among other media.

On February 24, 2026, The Daily Show aired a segment featuring space sexology researchers Maria Santaguida and Simon Dubé discussing their research on sex in space. During the segment, they presented a replica of the 2Suit, which Santaguida had recreated. Correspondent Michael Kosta tested the suit under simulated spaceflight conditions, using an inflatable doll referred to as “Judy” as part of the demonstration.

== See also ==
- Sex in space
- Space advocacy
- Space settlement
- Space tourism

== Notes (International 2Suit articles) ==
- La fantasía del sexo en gravedad cero PERU21; 29 August 2012
- S’envoyer en l’air dans l’espace Par Kieron Monks, Metro World News; 11 Avril 2012
- Seks in de ruimte: is het mogelijk?, By Caroline Hoek; 7 April 2012
- Wakacje w Kosmosie? Dajcie sobie z tym spokój!, by Tomasz Rożek, GAZETA; 17 October 2011
- Oλοσωμη φόρμα για ερωτικές περιπτύξεις στο Διάστημα Space Travels; 16 February 2011
- Tener bebés en el espacio podría ser peligroso FayerWayer, (Science Feature) Boxbyte en Ciencia, Destacados; October 2010
- Haben Astronauten eigentlich Sex im All? BILD magazine; 3 July 2010
- Intergalactisch hoogtepunt Desterren Nieuws, by Bert Carrein; 22 April 2010
