= STS-75 =

1996 American crewed spaceflight

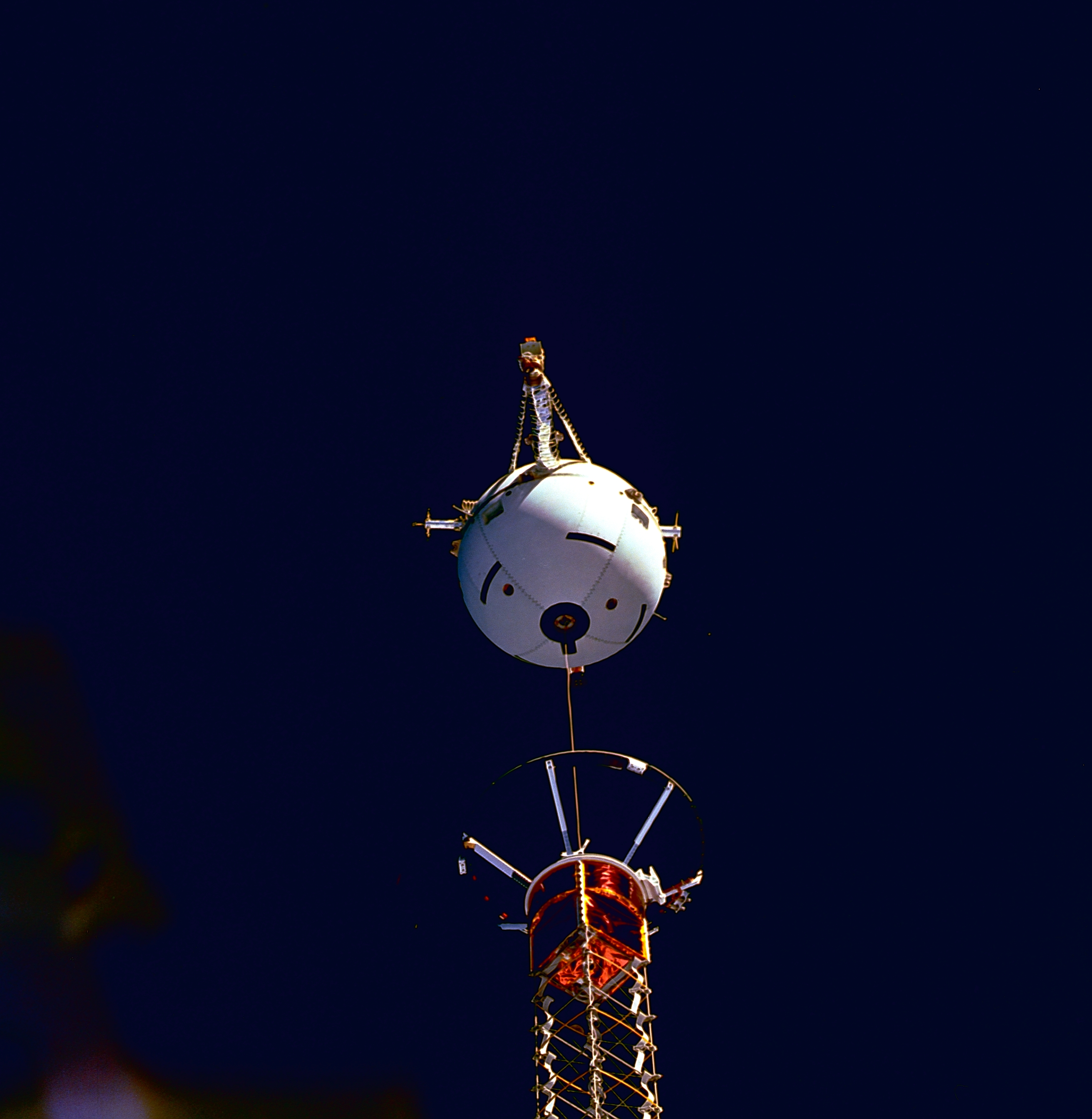
- Deployment of the Tethered Satellite System
- Mission type: Microgravity research Technology development
- Operator: NASA
- COSPAR ID: 1996-012A
- SATCAT no.: 23801
- Mission duration: 15 days, 17 hours, 40 minutes, 22 seconds
- Distance travelled: 10,500,000 kilometres (6,500,000 mi)
- Orbits completed: 252

Spacecraft properties
- Spacecraft: Space Shuttle Columbia
- Payload mass: 10,592 kilograms (23,351 lb)

Crew
- Crew size: 7
- Members: Andrew M. Allen; Scott J. Horowitz; Jeffrey A. Hoffman; Maurizio Cheli; Claude Nicollier; Franklin R. Chang-Diaz; Umberto Guidoni

Start of mission
- Launch date: 22 February 1996, 20:18:00 UTC
- Launch site: Kennedy, LC-39B

End of mission
- Landing date: 9 March 1996, 13:58:22 UTC
- Landing site: Kennedy, SLF Runway 33

Orbital parameters
- Reference system: Geocentric
- Regime: Low Earth
- Perigee altitude: 277 kilometres (172 mi)
- Apogee altitude: 320 kilometres (200 mi)
- Inclination: 28.45 degrees
- Period: 90.5 minutes
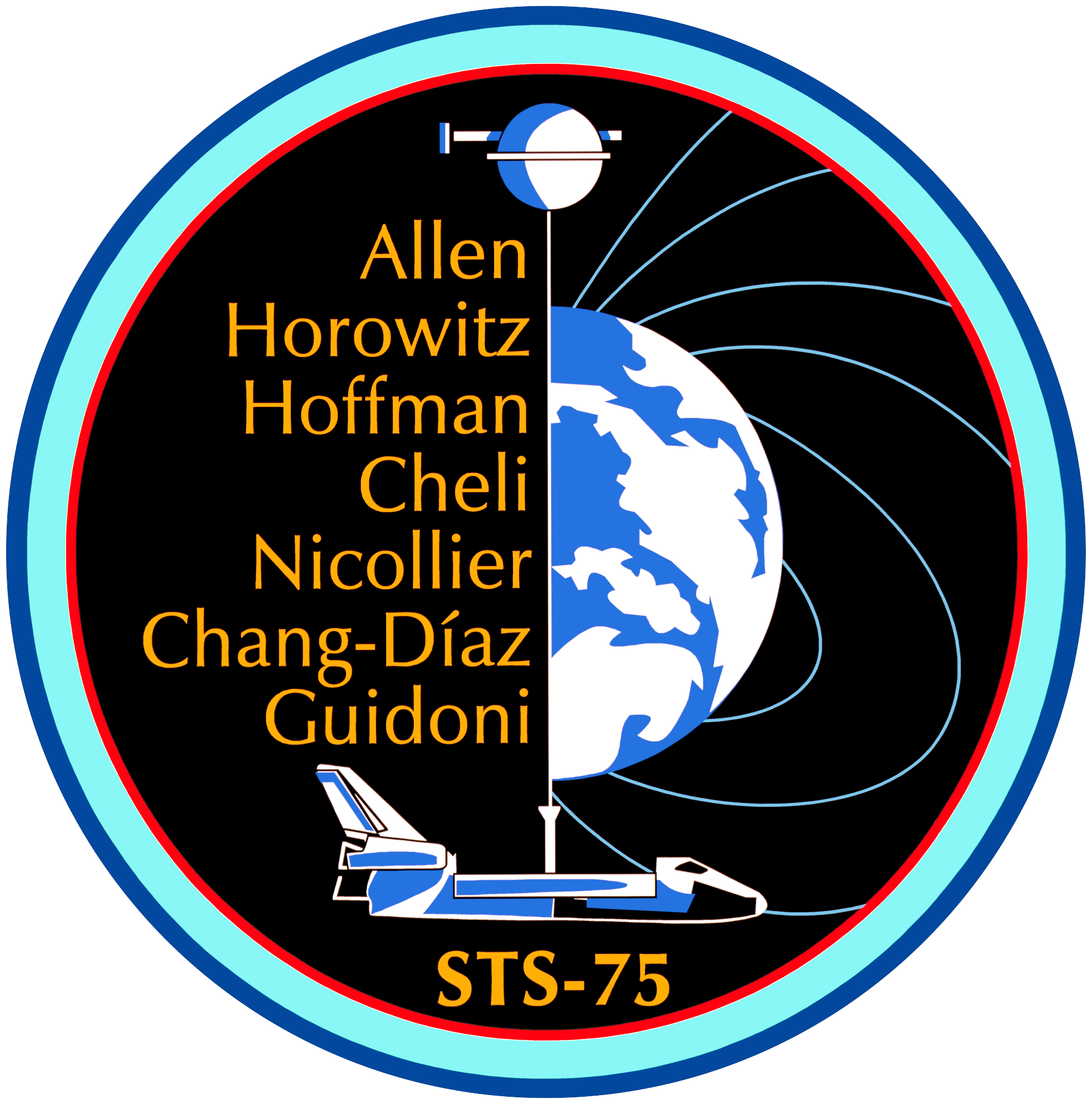
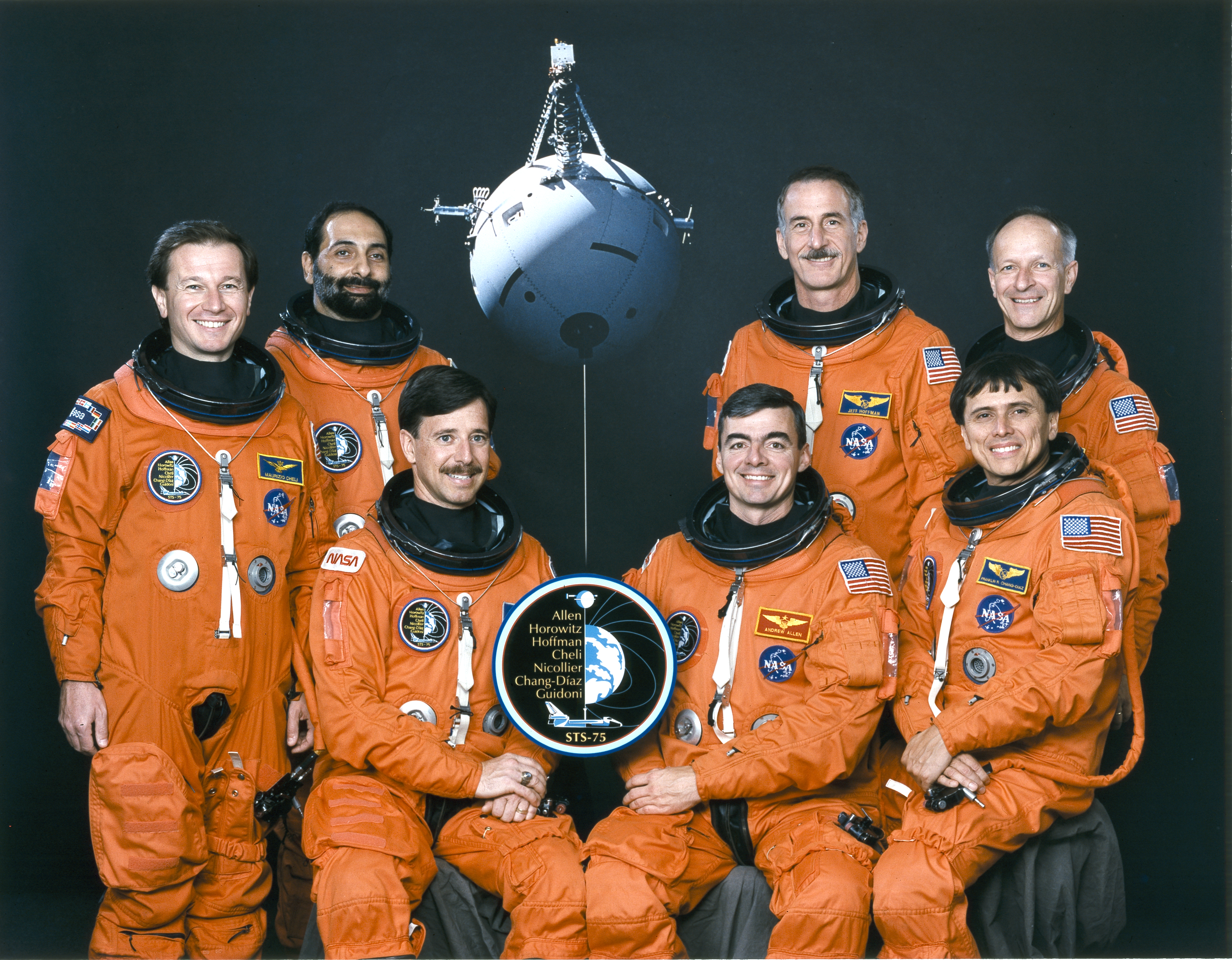
- Left to right - Seated: Horowitz, Allen, Chang-Diaz; Standing: Cheli, Guidoni, Hoffman, Nicollier Space Shuttle program

STS-75 was a 1996 NASA Space Shuttle mission, the 19th mission of the Columbia orbiter.

== Crew ==
Position	Astronaut
Commander	(United States) Andrew M. Allen; Third and last spaceflight
Pilot	(United States) Scott J. Horowitz; First spaceflight
Mission Specialist 1	(United States) Jeffrey A. Hoffman; Fifth and last spaceflight
Mission Specialist 2 Flight Engineer	(Italy) Maurizio Cheli, ESA; Only spaceflight
Mission Specialist 3	(Switzerland) Claude Nicollier, ESA; Third spaceflight
Mission Specialist 4 Payload Commander	(United States) / (Costa Rica) Franklin Chang-Díaz; Fifth spaceflight
Payload Specialist	(Italy) Umberto Guidoni, ASI; First spaceflight
Allen, Hoffman, Nicollier and Chang-Díaz had previously been members of the STS-46 crew, which had flown the TSS-1 experiment in 1992.

=== Crew seat assignments ===
Seat	Launch	Landing	Seats 1–4 are on the flight deck. Seats 5–7 are on the mid-deck.
1	Allen		Seats 1–4 are on the flight deck. Seats 5–7 are on the mid-deck.
2	Horowitz		Seats 1–4 are on the flight deck. Seats 5–7 are on the mid-deck.
3	Hoffman	Nicollier	Seats 1–4 are on the flight deck. Seats 5–7 are on the mid-deck.
4	Cheli		Seats 1–4 are on the flight deck. Seats 5–7 are on the mid-deck.
5	Nicollier	Hoffman	Seats 1–4 are on the flight deck. Seats 5–7 are on the mid-deck.
6	Chang-Diaz		Seats 1–4 are on the flight deck. Seats 5–7 are on the mid-deck.
7	Guidoni		Seats 1–4 are on the flight deck. Seats 5–7 are on the mid-deck.

== Mission objective ==
=== Tethered Satellite System ===
The primary objective of STS-75 was to carry the Tethered Satellite System Reflight (TSS-1R) into orbit and to deploy it spaceward on a conducting tether. The mission also flew the United States Microgravity Payload (USMP-3) designed to investigate materials science and condensed matter physics.

The TSS-1R mission was a reflight of TSS-1 which was flown onboard Space Shuttle Atlantis on STS-46 in July/August 1992. The Tether Satellite System circled the Earth at an altitude of 296 kilometers, placing the tether system within the rarefied electrically charged layer of the atmosphere known as the ionosphere.

STS-75 mission scientists hoped to deploy the tether to a distance of 20.7 kilometers (12.9 mi; 11.2 nmi). Over 19 kilometers (12 mi; 10 nmi) of the tether was deployed (over a period of 5 hours) before the tether broke. Many pieces of floating debris were produced by the plasma discharge and rupture of the tether, and some collided with it. The satellite remained in orbit for a number of weeks and was easily visible from the ground.

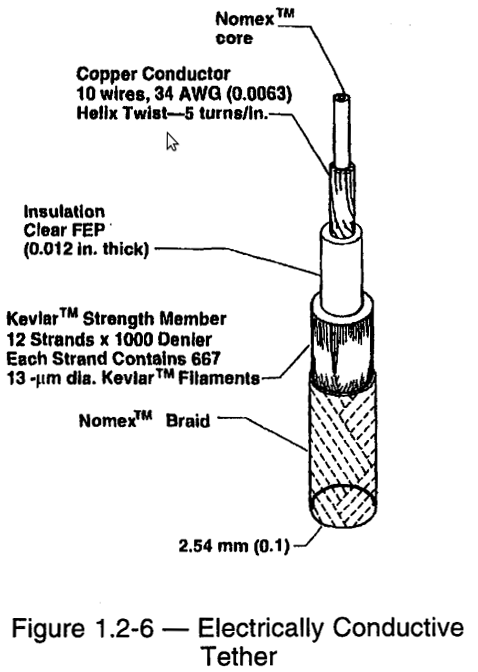
TSS-1R tether composition [NASA]

The electric conductor of the tether was a copper braid wound around a nylon (Nomex) string. It was encased in teflon-like insulation, with an outer cover of kevlar, inside a nylon (Nomex) sheath. The culprit turned out to be the innermost core, made of a porous material which, during its manufacture, trapped many bubbles of air at atmospheric pressure.

Later vacuum-chamber experiments suggested that the unwinding of the reel uncovered pinholes in the insulation. That in itself would not have caused a major problem, because the ionosphere around the tether, under normal circumstance, was too rarefied to divert much of the current. However, the air trapped in the insulation changed that. As air bubbled out of the pinholes, the high voltage of the nearby tether, about 3500 volts, converted it into a relatively dense plasma (similar to the ignition of a fluorescent tube), and therefore made the tether a much better conductor of electricity. This plasma diverted to the metal of the shuttle and from there to the ionospheric return circuit. That current was enough to melt the cable.

The specific TSS-1R mission objectives were: characterize the current-voltage response of the TSS-orbiter system, characterize the satellite's high-voltage sheath structure and current collection process, demonstrate electric power generation, verify tether control laws and basic tether dynamics, demonstrate the effect of neutral gas on the plasma sheath and current collection, characterize the TSS radio frequency and plasma wave emissions and characterize the TSS dynamic-electrodynamic coupling.

TSS-1R Science Investigations included: TSS Deployer Core Equipment and Satellite Core Equipment (DCORE/SCORE), Research on Orbital Plasma Electrodynamics (ROPE), Research on Electrodynamic Tether Effects (RETE), Magnetic Field Experiment for TSS Missions (TEMAG), Shuttle Electrodynamic Tether System (SETS), Shuttle Potential and Return Electron Experiment (SPREE), Tether Optical Phenomena Experiment (TOP), Investigation of Electromagnetic Emissions by the Electrodynamic Tether (EMET), Observations at the Earth's Surface of Electromagnetic Emissions by TSS (OESSE), Investigation and Measurement of Dynamic Noise in the TSS (IMDN), Theoretical and Experimental Investigation of TSS Dynamics (TEID) and the Theory and Modeling in Support of Tethered Satellite Applications (TMST).

=== Other mission objectives ===
The USMP-3 payload consisted of four major experiments mounted on two Mission Peculiar Experiment Support Structures (MPESS) and three Shuttle Mid-deck experiments. The experiments were: Advanced Automated Directional Solidification Furnace (AADSF), Material pour l'Etude des Phenomenes Interessant la Solidification sur Terre et en Orbite (MEPHISTO), Space Acceleration Measurement System (SAMS), Orbital Acceleration Research Experiment (OARE), Critical Fluid Light Scattering Experiment (ZENO) and Isothermal Dendritic Growth Experiment (IDGE).

== Alternating use of bunk bed ==
Jewish astronauts Jeffrey A. Hoffman and Scott J. Horowitz alternated use of the same bunk bed. Upon Horowitz's request, Hoffman attached a mezuzah using Velcro.

== Fictional STS-75 mission ==
STS-75 was the shuttle mission described in the fictional NASA Document 12-571-3570, although this document was disseminated several years before STS-75 was launched. The document purports to report on experiments to determine effective sexual positions in microgravity. Astronomer and scientific writer Pierre Kohler mistook this document for fact and is responsible for a major increase in its redistribution in the early 21st century. Conspiracy theories first made in the early beginnings of the Shuttle era of sex in space were suddenly made rampant again, causing a minor press debacle among tabloids.
