= STS-61-E =

Canceled NASA Space Shuttle mission

- Names: Space Transportation System
- Mission type: Observations of the Comet of Halley
- Operator: NASA
- Mission duration: 8 days, 22 hours, 2 minutes (planned)

Spacecraft properties
- Spacecraft: Space Shuttle Columbia (planned)
- Launch mass: 1,217,990 kg (2,685,210 lb)
- Landing mass: 90,584 kg (199,704 lb)
- Payload mass: 21,937 kg (48,363 lb)

Crew
- Crew size: 7
- Members: Jon A. McBride; Richard N. Richards; Jeffrey A. Hoffman; David C. Leestma; Robert A. Parker; Samuel T. Durrance; Ronald A. Parise

Start of mission
- Launch date: 6 March 1986, 10:45 UTC (planned)
- Rocket: Space Shuttle Columbia
- Launch site: Kennedy Space Center, LC-39B
- Contractor: Rockwell International

End of mission
- Landing date: 15 March 1986, 08:47 UTC (planned)
- Landing site: Kennedy Space Center

Orbital parameters
- Reference system: Geocentric orbit (planned)
- Regime: Low Earth orbit
- Perigee altitude: 285 km (177 mi)
- Apogee altitude: 295 km (183 mi)
- Inclination: 28.45°
- Period: 90.40 minutes
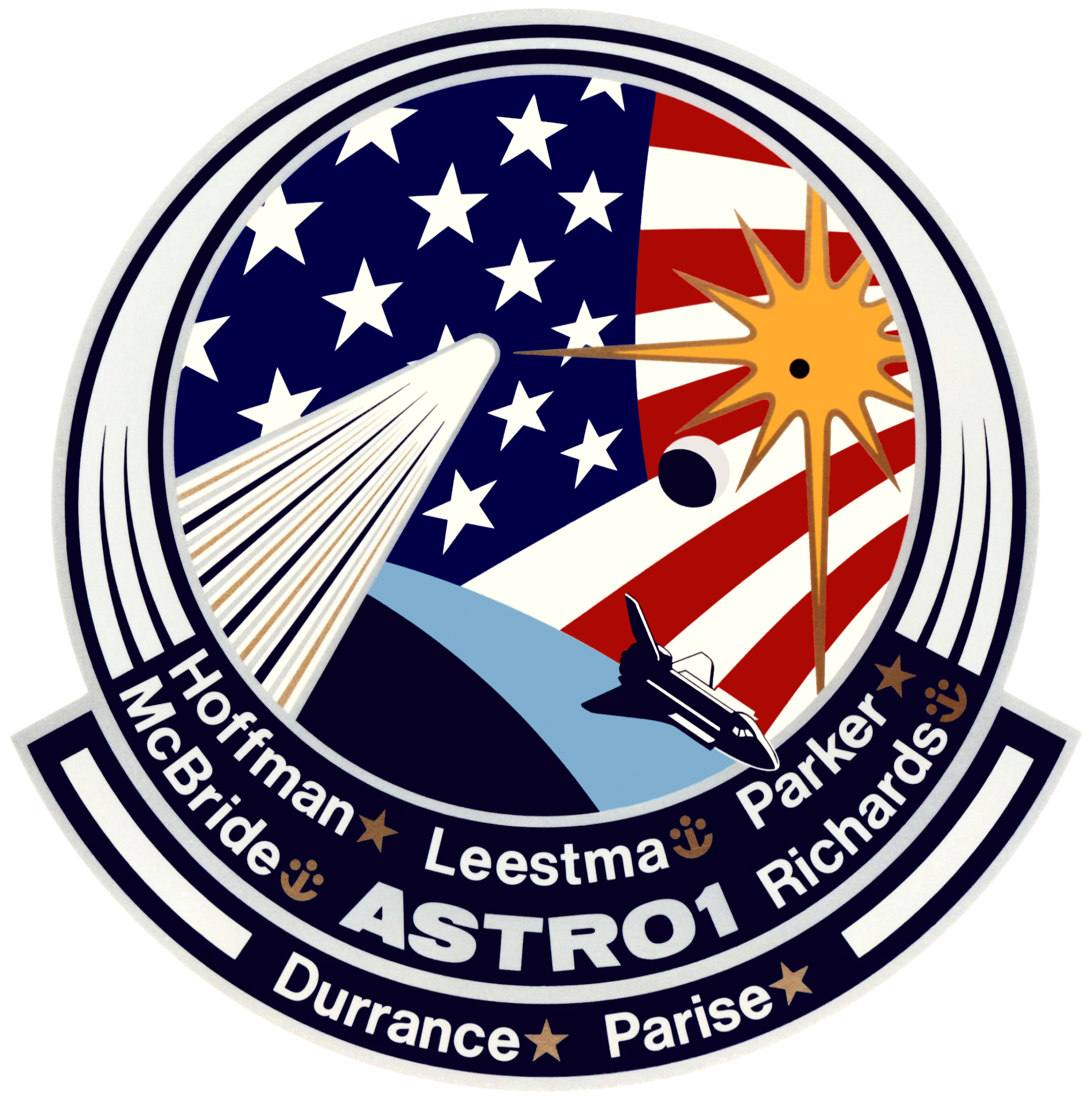
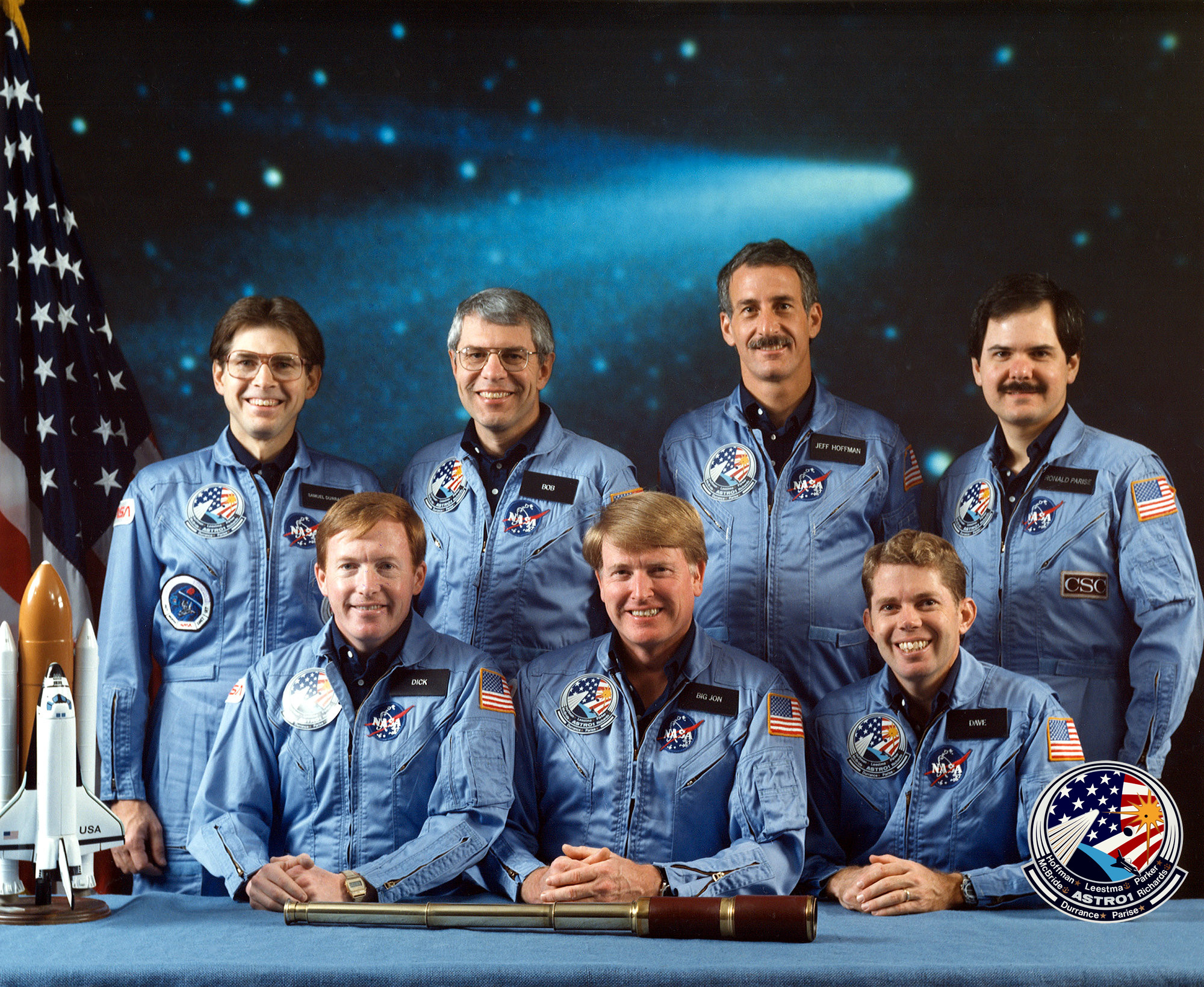
- STS-61-E mission patch Back row: Samuel T. Durrance, Robert A. Parker, Jeffrey A. Hoffman, Ronald A. Parise; Front row: Richard N. Richards, Jon A. McBride, David C. Leestma Space Shuttle program Cancelled Shuttle missions

STS-61-E was a NASA Space Shuttle mission planned to launch on 6 March 1986 using Columbia. It was canceled after the Challenger disaster.

== Crew ==
Position	Astronaut
Commander	Jon A. McBride; Would have been second space mission
Pilot	Richard N. Richards; Would have been first space mission
Mission Specialist 1	Jeffrey A. Hoffman; Would have been second space mission
Mission Specialist 2	David C. Leestma; Would have been second space mission
Mission Specialist 3	Robert A. Parker; Would have been second space mission
Payload Specialist 1	Samuel T. Durrance; Would have been first space mission
Payload Specialist 2	Ronald A. Parise; Would have been first space mission

=== Backup crew ===
Position	Astronaut
Payload Specialist	Kenneth H. Nordsieck

== Mission objectives ==
Columbia was to carry the ASTRO-1 observatory, which would be used to make astronomical observations including observations of Halley's Comet. ASTRO-1 consisted of three ultraviolet telescopes mounted on two Spacelab pallets, controlled by the Instrument Pointing System (IPS) which was first tested on STS-51-F.

After the Challenger disaster, the flight was remanifested as STS-35 and several crew members were replaced. Both Richards and Leestma were reassigned to STS-28 while McBride left NASA in 1989. Vance D. Brand replaced McBride as the commander while Guy S. Gardner and John M. Lounge replaced Richards and Leestma, respectively.

== See also ==
- Canceled Space Shuttle missions
- STS-35
