= Lapierre =

Lapierre or LaPierre is a surname, and may refer to:

== People ==
- Dominique Lapierre (1931–2022), French author
- Edmond Lapierre (1866–1960), Canadian politician
- Fabrice Lapierre (born 1983), Australian long jumper
- Gary LaPierre (1942–2019), American radio broadcaster
- Hendrix Lapierre (born 2002), Canadian ice hockey player
- Jean Lapierre (1956–2016), Canadian television broadcaster and politician
- Judith Lapierre (born 1967), Canadian professor of nursing, studied at International Space University
- Laurier LaPierre (1929–2012), Canadian journalist, retired broadcaster and senator
- Maxim Lapierre (born 1985), Canadian hockey player
- Nicolas Lapierre (born 1984), French race car driver
- Odette Lapierre (born 1955), Canadian long-distance runner
- Réal Lapierre (born 1944), Canadian politician
- Wayne LaPierre (born 1949), American author, gun rights advocate, and CEO of the National Rifle Association of America
