= Jon McBride =

American astronaut (1943–2024)

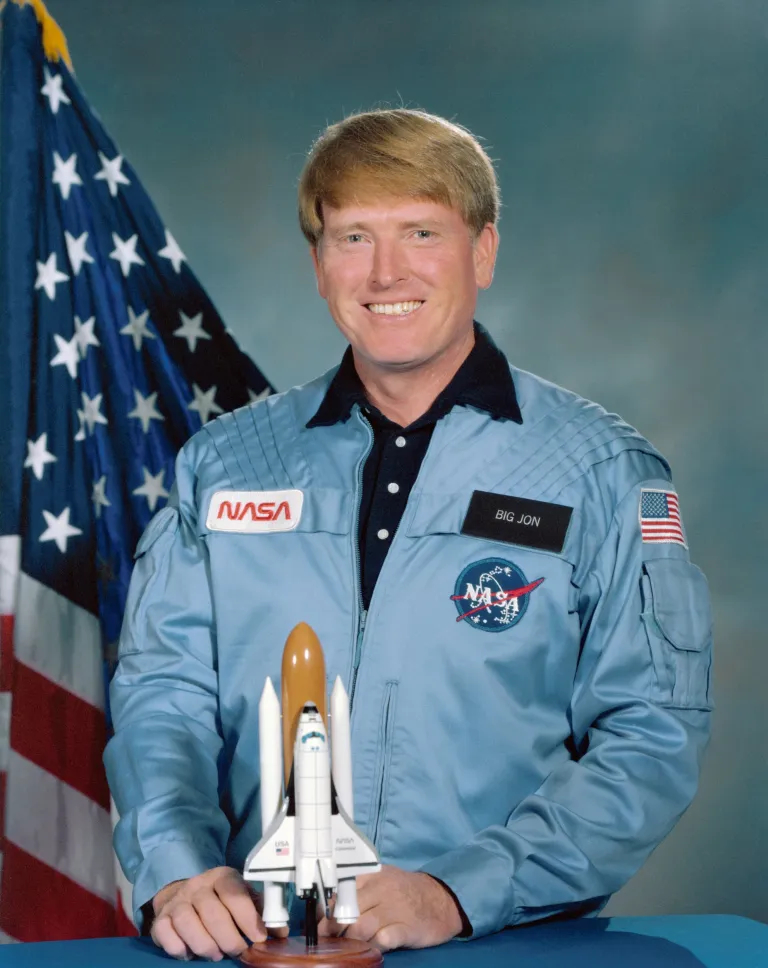
- Born: Jon Andrew McBride; August 14, 1943; Charleston, West Virginia, U.S.
- Died: August 7, 2024 (aged 80); Merritt Island, Florida, U.S.
- Education: West Virginia University; Naval Postgraduate School (BS); Pepperdine University
- Awards: Legion of Merit; Defense Superior Service Medal; Air Medal
- Space career

NASA astronaut
- Rank: Captain, USN
- Time in space: 8d 5h 23m
- Selection: NASA Group 8 (1978)
- Missions: STS-41-G; STS-61-E (never flew)
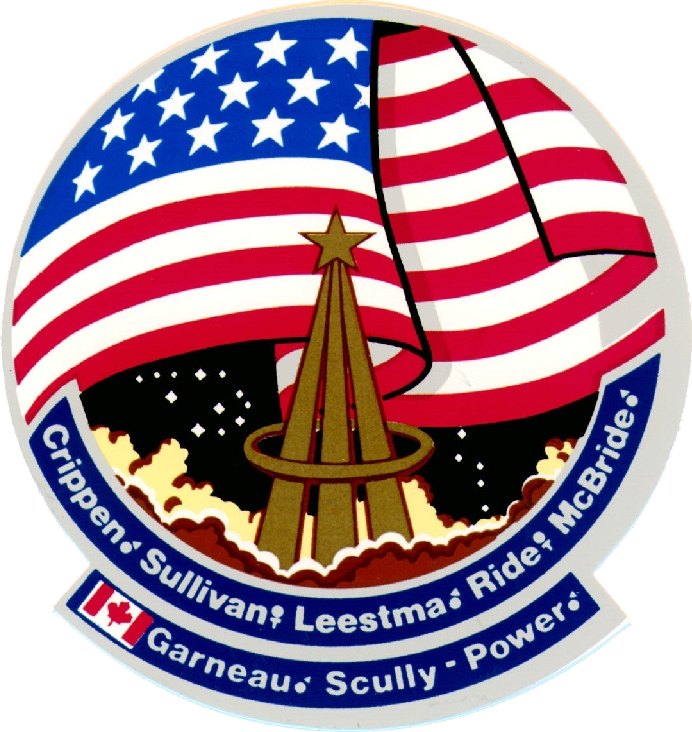
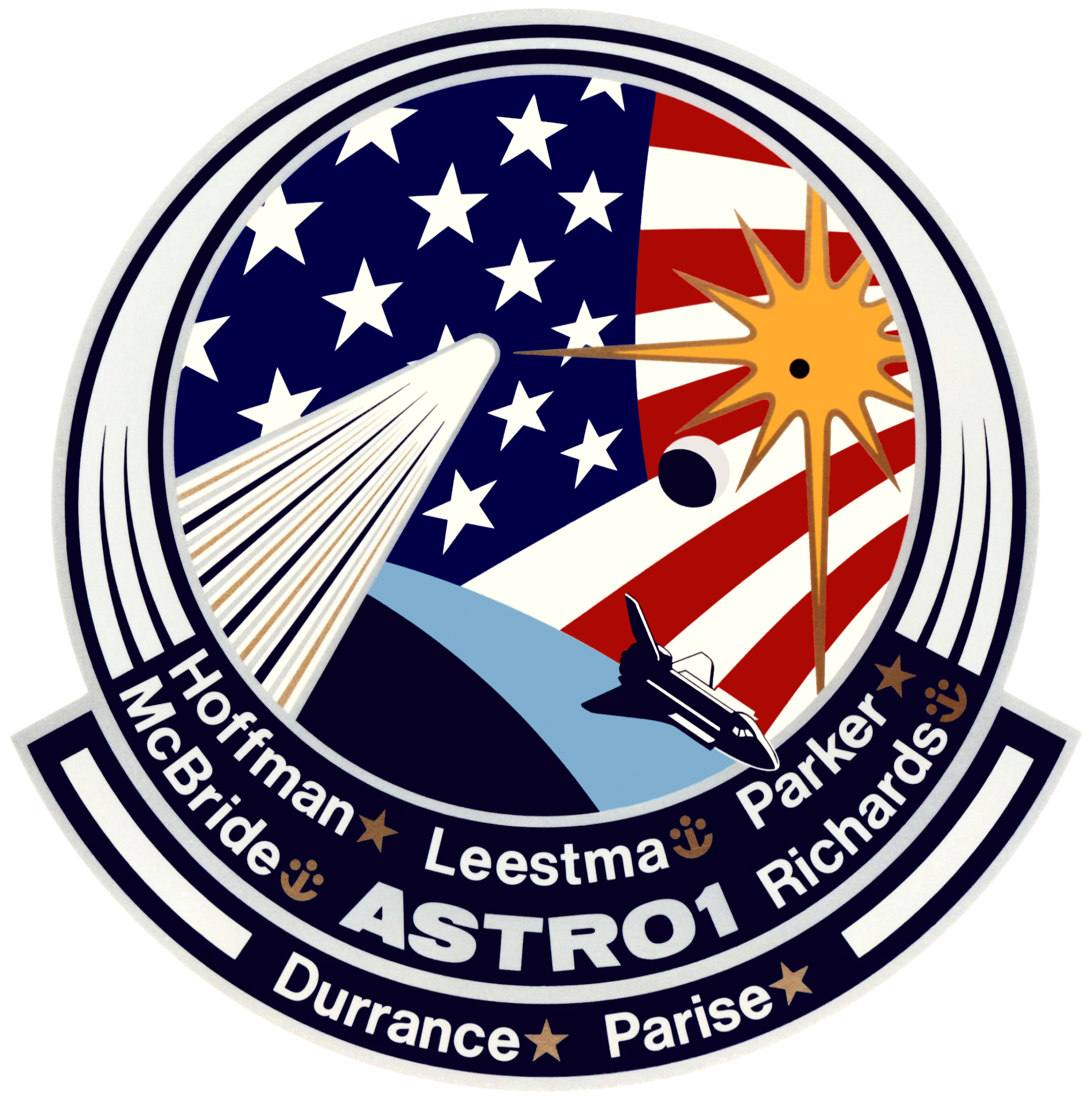
- Mission insignia
- Retired: May 12, 1989

Jon Andrew McBride (August 14, 1943 – August 7, 2024) was an American naval officer, test pilot, astronaut and administrator for NASA.

Throughout his career with the United States Navy, McBride served as an aviator, a fighter pilot, a test pilot, and an aeronautical engineer. He had achieved the rank of captain when he retired in 1989.

McBride was an astronaut with NASA, a role in which he piloted STS-41-G, and would have been commander of STS-61-E had the mission not been canceled as the next scheduled launch in the wake of the Challenger disaster.

== Early life, education and personal life ==
Jon McBride was born on August 14, 1943—the youngest of five siblings—in Charleston, West Virginia. When he was still a young child, his family moved to Beckley, West Virginia, which he considered to be his hometown. In 1960, he graduated from Beckley's Woodrow Wilson High School, then attended West Virginia University from 1960–1964 and received a Bachelor of Science degree in Aeronautical Engineering from the U.S. Naval Postgraduate School in 1971. He did graduate work in Human Resource Management at Pepperdine University. At West Virginia University, McBride became a member of the Phi Delta Theta fraternity.

McBride was married to the former Brenda Lou Stewart in 1966. They had three children, Richard M. (1962–1992), Melissa L. (1966), and Jon A. (1970). After their divorce in 1986, he married the former Sharon Lynn White in 1988, which also ended in divorce in 2019.

== Military career ==
McBride's naval service began in 1965 with flight training at Naval Air Station Pensacola in Florida. After being designated a naval aviator and receiving his wings in August 1966, he was assigned to Fighter Squadron 101 (VF-101) based at Naval Air Station Oceana in Virginia for training on the F-4 Phantom II aircraft. He was subsequently assigned to Fighter Squadron 41 (VF-41) where he served three years as a fighter pilot and division officer. He also served tours with VF-11 and VF-103. While deployed in Southeast Asia, McBride flew 64 combat missions during the Vietnam War.

He attended the U.S. Air Force Test Pilot School (Class 75A) at Edwards Air Force Base in California before reporting to Air Test and Development Squadron Four (VX-4) at Naval Air Station Point Mugu in California, where he served as a maintenance officer and Sidewinder project officer. He flew over 40 different types of military and civilian aircraft and piloted the Navy "Spirit of '76" bicentennial-painted F-4J Phantom in various air shows during 1976, 1977, and 1978. He held Federal Aviation Administration ratings which included civilian commercial pilot certificate (multi-engine), instrument, and glider, and he previously served as a certified flight instructor.

He logged over 8,800 hours of flying time—including 4,700 hours in jet aircraft and over 600 carrier landings.

== NASA career ==
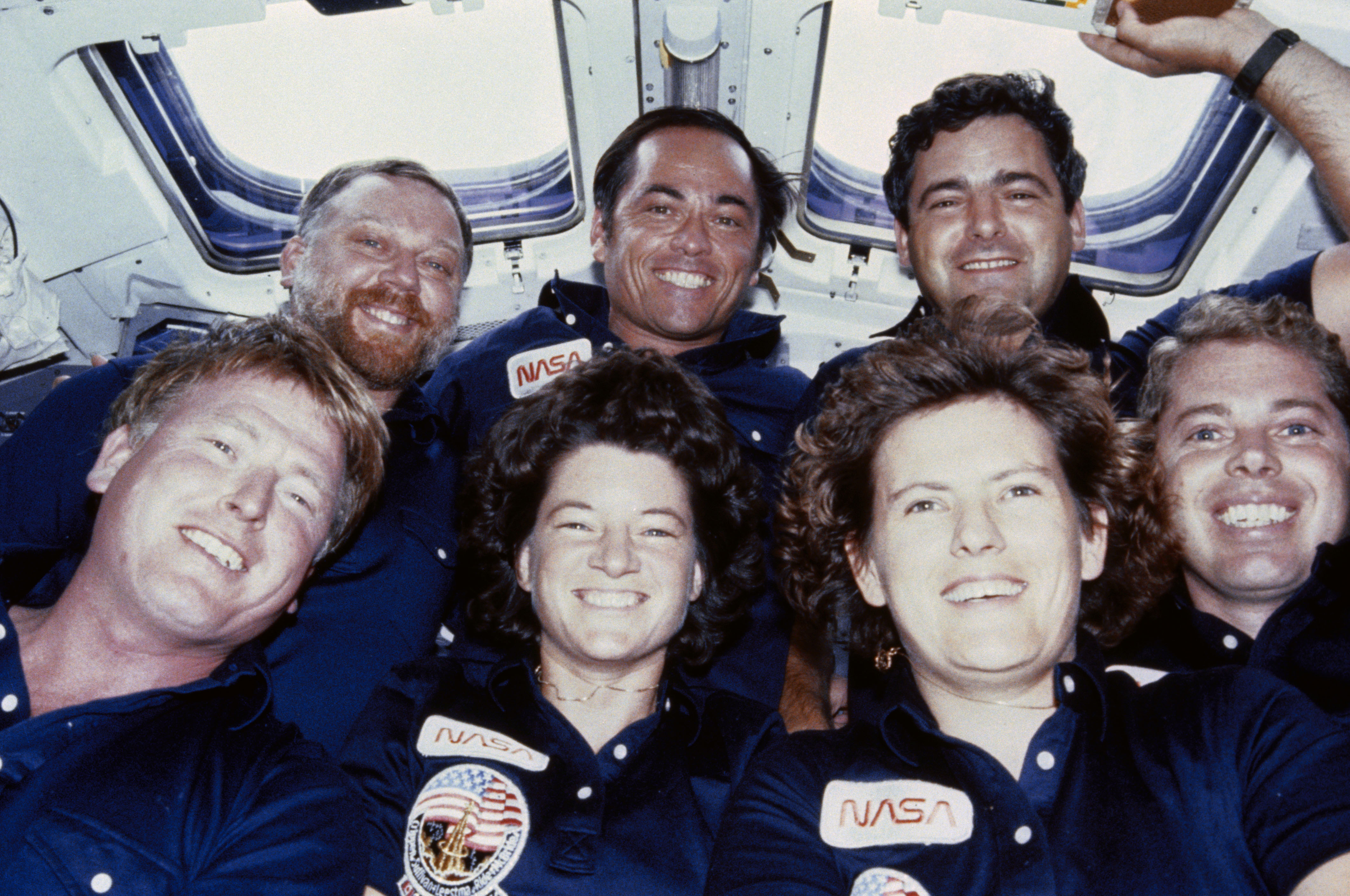
McBride (bottom left) with the crew of the STS-41-G mission

Selected as an astronaut candidate by NASA in January 1978, McBride became an astronaut in August 1979, the first astronaut from West Virginia. His NASA assignments included lead chase pilot for the maiden voyage of Space Shuttle Columbia, software verification in the Shuttle Avionics Integration Laboratory (SAIL), capsule communicator for STS-5, STS-6, and STS-7, flight data file manager, and orbital rendezvous procedures development.

McBride was the pilot of STS-41-G, which launched from Kennedy Space Center in Florida, on October 5, 1984, aboard the Orbiter Challenger. This was the first crew of seven, at the time the largest crew ever sent into space. During their eight-day mission, crew members deployed the Earth Radiation Budget Satellite, conducted scientific observations of the Earth with the OSTA-3 pallet and Large Format Camera, and demonstrated potential satellite refueling with an EVA and associated hydrazine transfer. The mission duration was 197 hours and concluded with a landing at Kennedy Space Center in Florida, on October 13, 1984.

McBride was scheduled to fly again in March 1986 as the commander of STS-61-E. This flight was one of several deferred by NASA in the wake of the Challenger accident in January 1986.

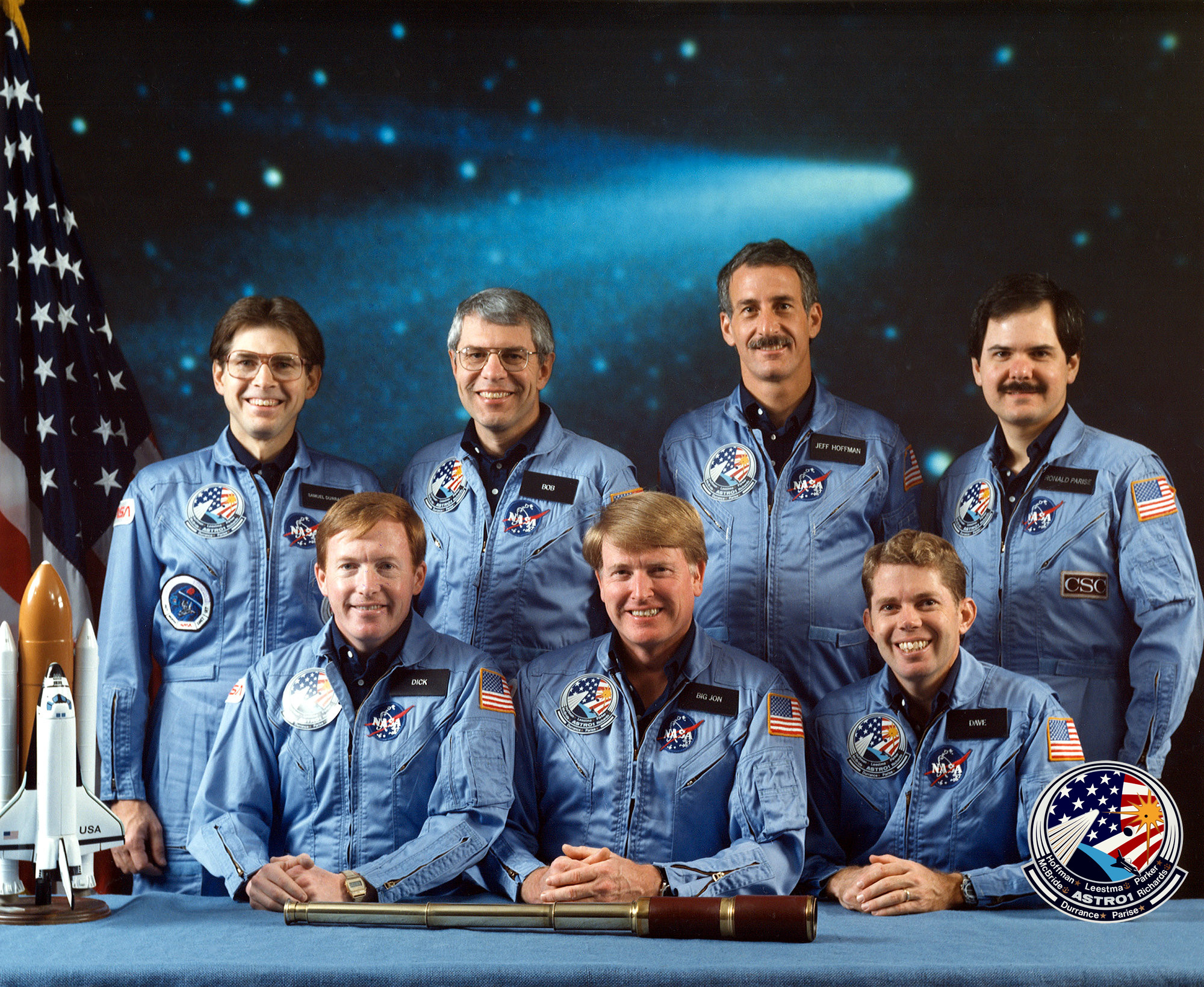
McBride (sitting in the middle), as commander of never flown STS-61-E spaceflight

On July 30, 1987, McBride was assigned to NASA Headquarters to serve as assistant administrator for Congressional Relations, with responsibility for NASA's relationship with the United States Congress, and for providing coordination and direction to all headquarters and field center communications with congressional support organizations. He held this post from September 1987 through March 1989. In 1988, McBride was named to command the crew of the STS-35 (ASTRO-1) mission, scheduled for launch in March 1990, but chose to retire from NASA instead.

== Post-NASA career ==
=== Business career ===
In May 1989, McBride retired from NASA and the U.S. Navy to pursue a business career. He moved to Lewisburg, West Virginia, where he became president and chief executive officer of the Flying Eagle Corporation, a venture capital firm, and president of the Constructors' Labor Council of West Virginia, a group representing heavy and highway construction contractors.

=== Political career ===
In 1996, he unsuccessfully vied for the Republican nomination for Governor of West Virginia, losing to Cecil H. Underwood.

=== Kennedy Space Center and retirement ===
By 2008, McBride was retired and living near Cocoa, Florida. According to a short interview on September 20, 2017, during a "Meet an Astronaut" event, he was also actively working on improving the Space Shuttle Experience ride. He had proposed to assist in the development of a landing sequence for the ride. McBride remained active supporting the "Lunch with an Astronaut" program at Kennedy Space Center until 2020 when he announced his retirement from duty at the visitors complex.

On September 23, 2011, the NASA Independent Verification and Validation Facility (IV&V) in Fairmont, West Virginia, dedicated a NASA software laboratory to McBride, a West Virginia native. The laboratory's official name is the Jon McBride Software Testing and Research Laboratory, or JSTAR. JSTAR is NASA IV&V's environment for adaptable testing and simulation, designed to enhance tools and methods used to critically assess mission and safety critical software across NASA's missions. The lab supports end-to-end testing on mission flight software through the application of analytical rigor to reduce the threat of software-related mission failure.

== Death ==
Jon McBride died on August 7, 2024, at the age of 80, in Merritt Island, Florida, just a week before his 81st birthday.

== Organizations ==
- Association of Naval Aviation
- Veterans of Foreign Wars
- American Legion
- Society of Experimental Test Pilots
- Phi Delta Theta
- National Honor Society
- West Virginia University Engineering Visiting Committee (Chairman, 1990–1992)
- University System of West Virginia Board of Trustees (1992–1995)
- Co-Chairman (with wife), American Cancer Society fund-raising (State of West Virginia) 1990
- Executive Committee, Boy Scouts of America
- President, Association of Space Explorers (USA) (1997–1998)
- Executive Committee, Association of Space Explorers (Co-President, 1995–1996)
- March of Dimes
- American Red Cross Disaster Relief
- Shawnee Hills Mental Health Group

== Awards and honors ==
- Legion of Merit
- Defense Superior Service Medal
- Air Medals (3)
- Navy Commendation Medal with Combat V
- Navy Unit Commendation
- National Defense Service Medal
- Vietnam Service Medal
- NASA Space Flight Medal
- West Virginia Secretary of State's "State Medallion" and appointed "West Virginia Ambassador of Good Will Among All Men" (1980)
- Honorary Doctorate in Aerospace Engineering from Salem College (1984)
- Honorary Doctorate of Science from West Virginia University (1985)
- Honorary Doctorate of Science from University of Charleston (1987)
- Honorary Doctorate of Science from West Virginia Institute of Technology (1987)
- West Virginia Society's "Son-of-the-Year" (1988), City of Beckley
- West Virginia "Hall of Fame"
- Distinguished Alumni; West Virginia University (1988)
- West Virginia's "Honorary Italian-American" (1988)
- Kanawha County, West Virginia's "Famous Person Award" (1988)
- West Virginia Broadcasters' "Man-of-the-Year" (1989)
- City of Hope's "Spirit of Life Award Winner" (1991)
- Daughters of the American Revolution "Medal of Honor" (1993)
- West Virginia Aviation Hall of Fame (2014)

== See also ==
- List of spaceflight records
