= Scott J. Horowitz =

American astronaut (born 1957)

Scott Horowitz
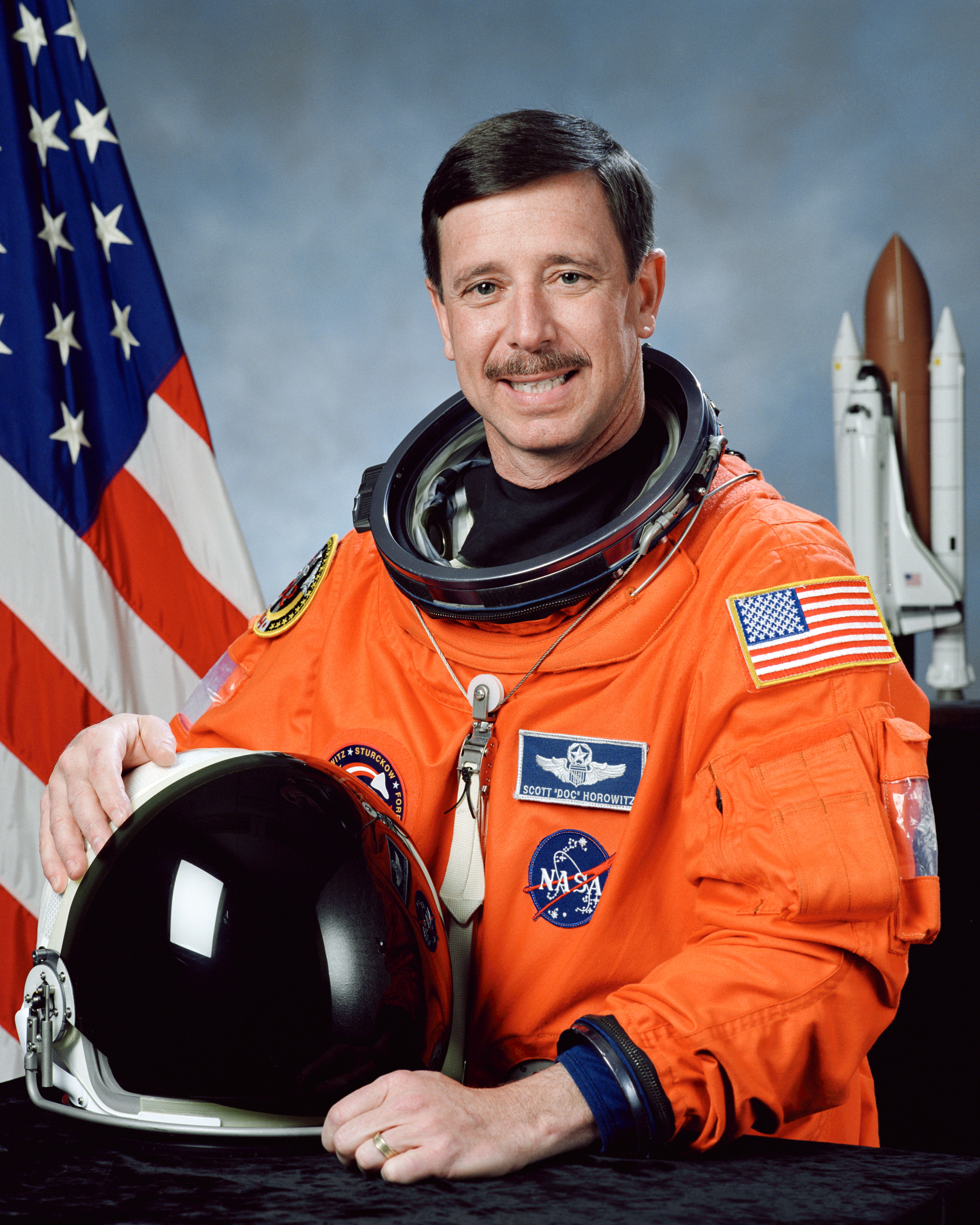
- Born: Scott Jay Horowitz; March 24, 1957 (age 69); Philadelphia, Pennsylvania, U.S.
- Other name: Doc
- Education: California State University, Northridge (BS); Georgia Institute of Technology (MS, PhD)
- Space career

NASA astronaut
- Rank: Colonel, USAF
- Time in space: 47d 10h 41m
- Selection: NASA Group 14 (1992)
- Missions: STS-75; STS-82; STS-101; STS-105
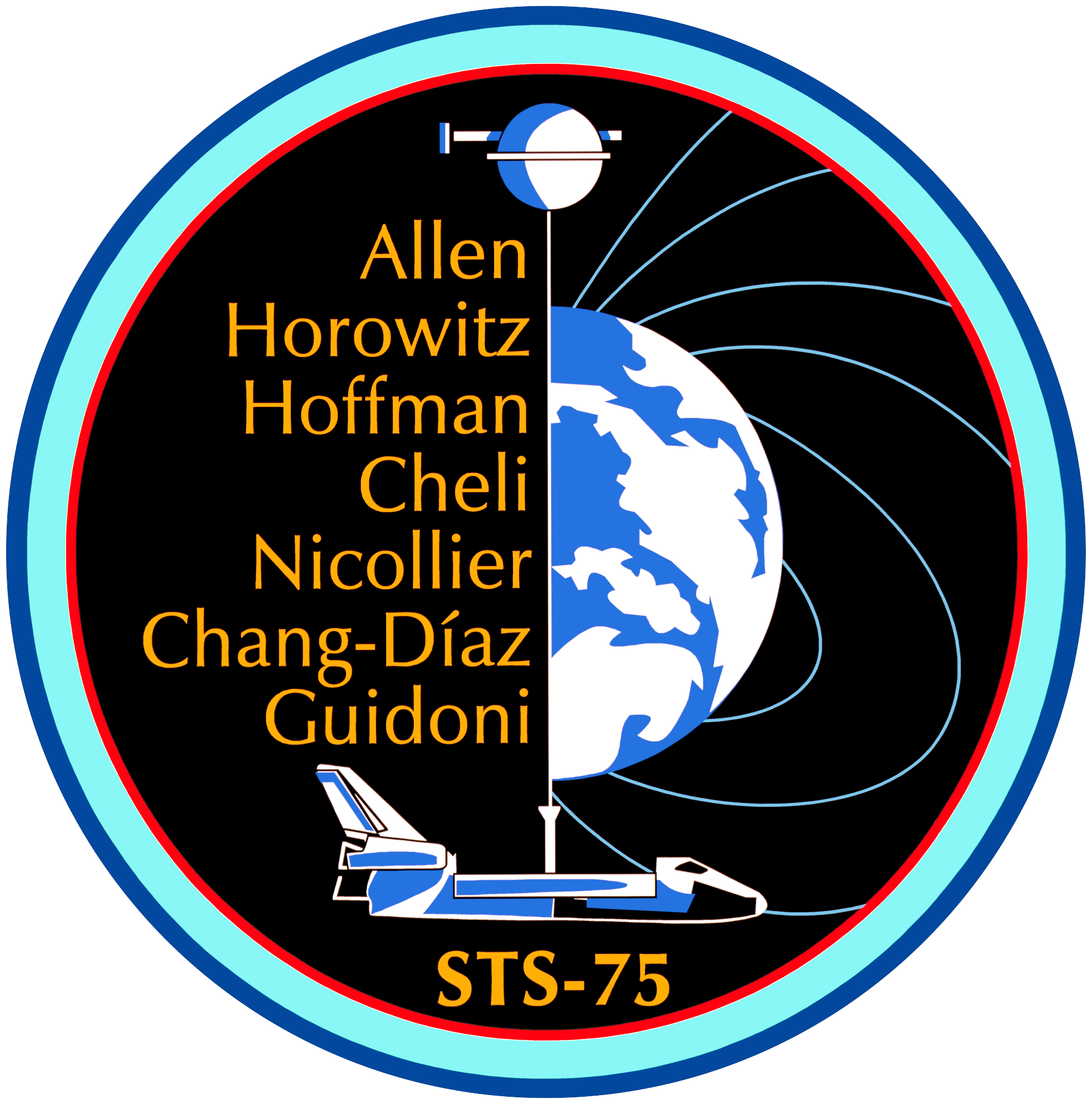
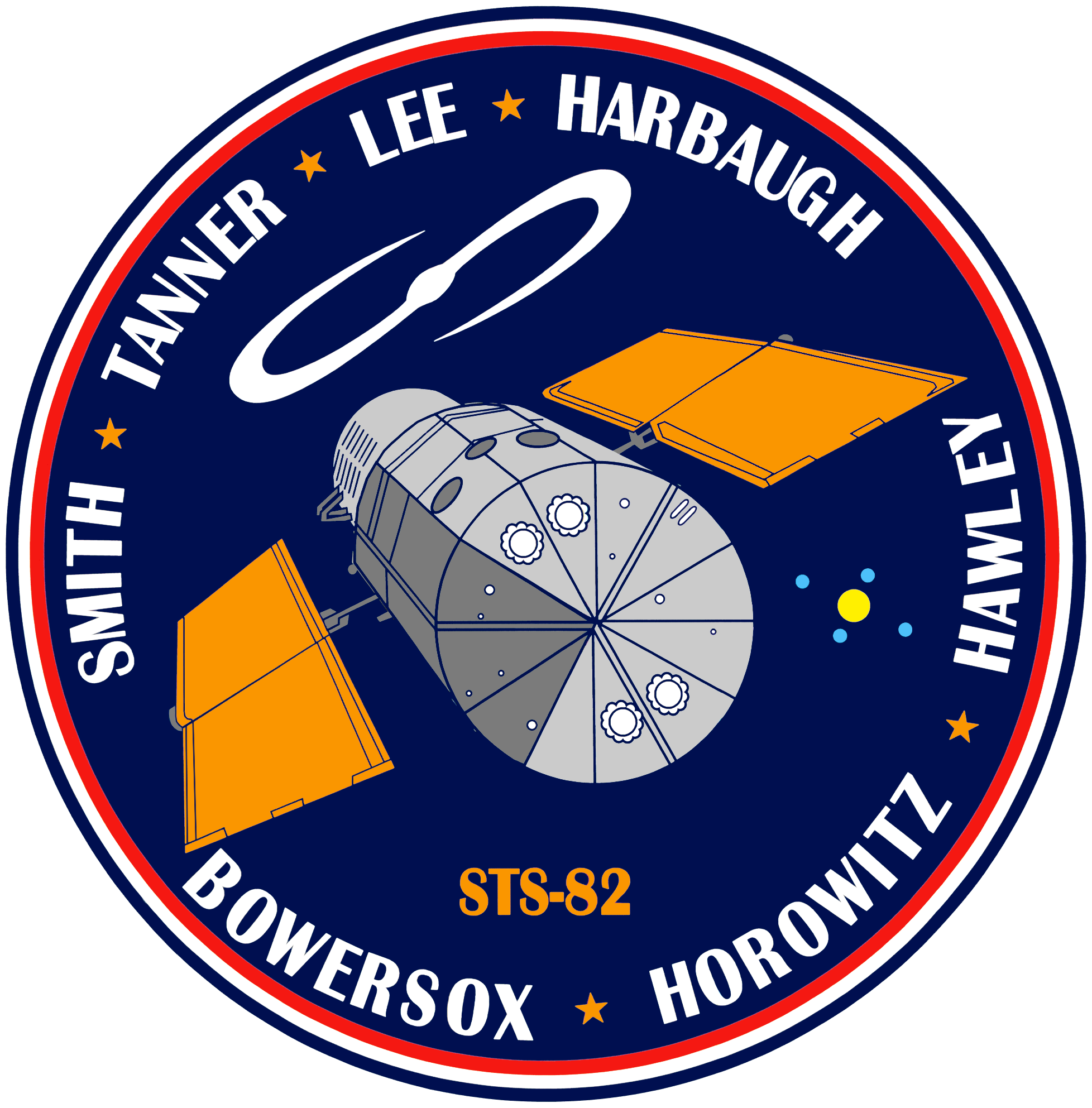
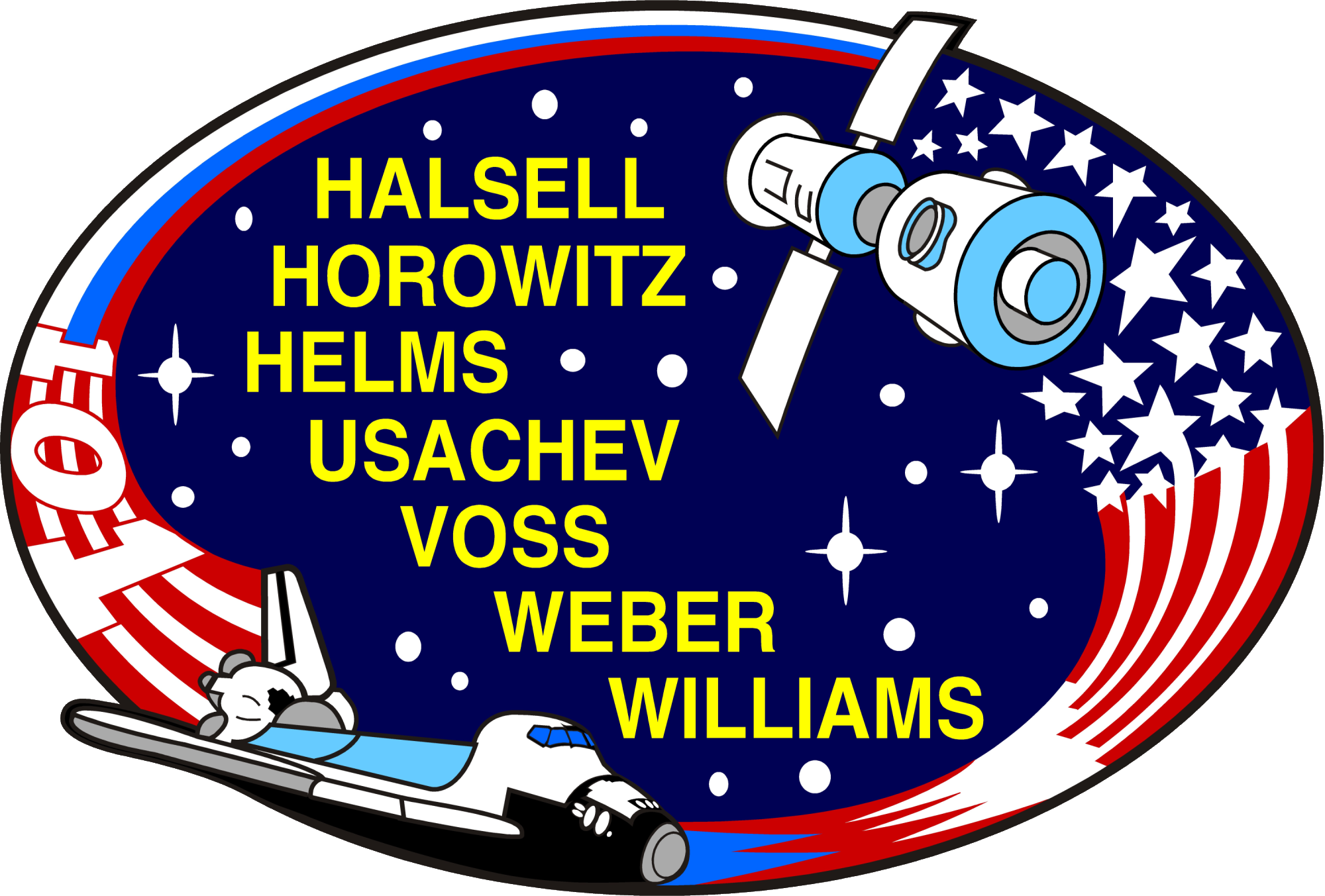
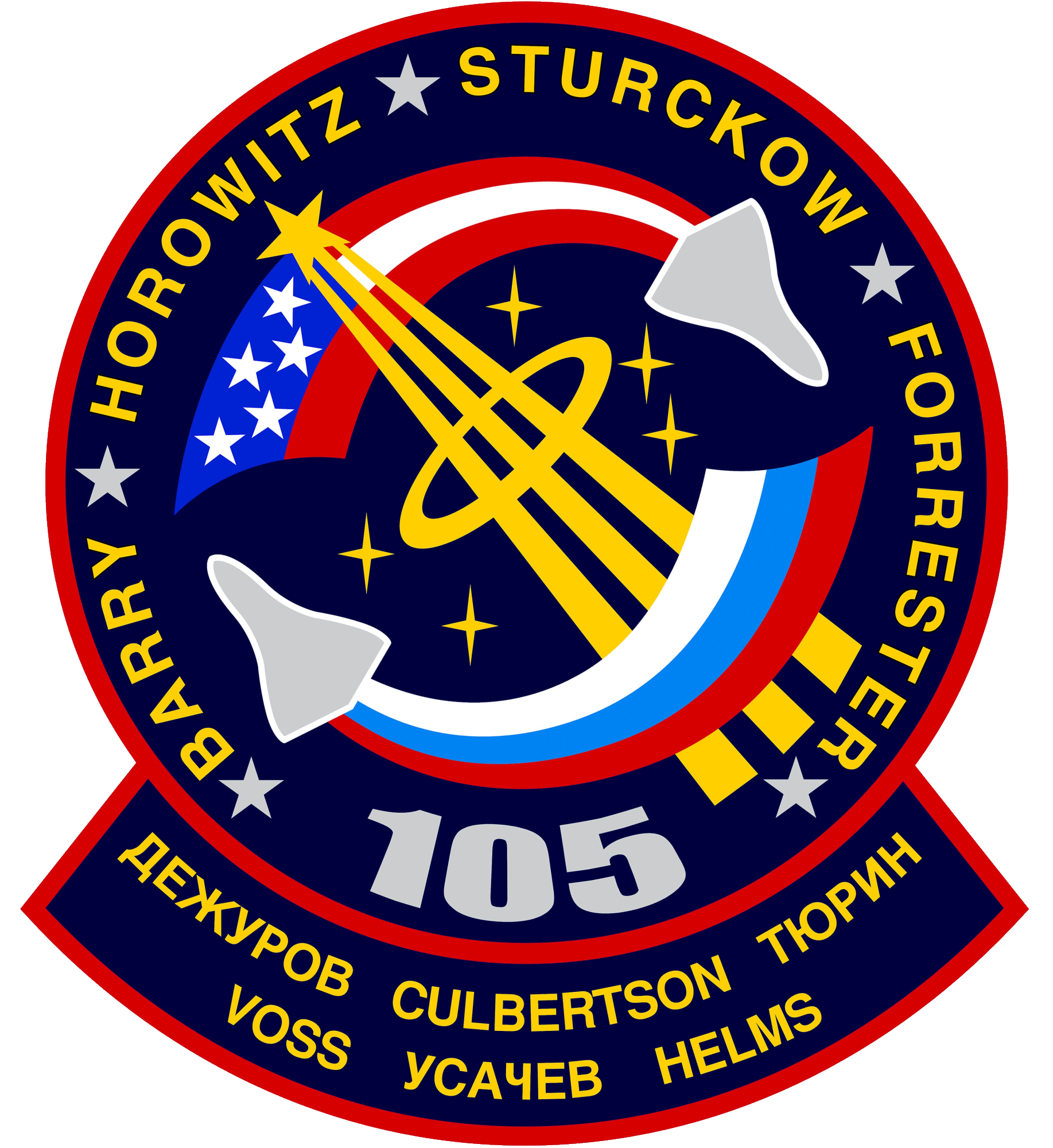
- Mission insignia

Scott Jay Horowitz (born March 24, 1957) is a retired American astronaut and a veteran of four Space Shuttle missions.

== Biography ==
Horowitz went to California State University, Northridge in 1974 where he earned his B.S. degree in engineering in 1978; he subsequently obtained a Ph.D. degree in aerospace engineering from the Georgia Institute of Technology in 1982, and then worked as a scientist for Lockheed Company.

== NASA career ==
Horowitz joined the United States Air Force and flew as a T-38 and F-15 pilot while also teaching courses in aircraft design and propulsion at Embry-Riddle Aeronautical University and later California State University, Fresno. He graduated from the United States Air Force Test Pilot School in Dec, 1990 as a member of class 90-A. Horowitz was selected as an astronaut candidate by NASA in 1992, and piloted missions STS-75 (1996), STS-82 (1997) and STS-101 (2000). He commanded mission STS-105 (2001), a visit to the International Space Station for equipment and crew transfer.

In STS-75, Horowitz and Jeffrey A. Hoffman, both Jewish, had alternating use of the same bunk bed, to which Hoffman attached, upon Horowitz's request, a mezuzah, using Velcro.

Horowitz retired from the United States Air Force and NASA in October 2004. He returned to NASA in September 2005 to become the Associate Administrator for the Exploration Systems Mission Directorate, in charge of the return of America to the Moon during the next decade.

=== Interim ===
During his interim away from NASA, Horowitz held a senior executive position with ATK Thiokol, the makers of the Space Shuttle solid rocket boosters. While there, he developed some ideas he had for new types of launch vehicles that used only solid fuel rockets. His ideas were crucial to the development of the mission hardware NASA has adopted for the Vision for Space Exploration. NASA Administrator Michael D. Griffin invited Horowitz back to NASA as an associate administrator so he could lead the effort to develop this hardware.

On July 11, 2007, Horowitz announced his intent to leave NASA effective October 1, 2007.

== Space flight experience ==
- STS-75 (February 22 – March 9, 1996: 15 days, 7 hours)

Tethered satellite reflight, lost due to broken tether

- STS-82 (February 11 – February 21, 1997: 9 days, 23 hours)

Hubble Space Telescope servicing

- STS-101 (May 19 – May 29, 2000: 9 days, 21 hours)

International Space Station supply mission

- STS-105 (August 10 – August 22, 2001: 11 days, 21 hours)

International Space Station supply mission & crew rotation

== Post NASA ==
Horowitz has been active in advocating reorienting NASA's focus to human exploration of Mars, with the goals of permanent human outposts and settlements on the red planet. Horowitz is a member of the steering committee of the Mars Society. On one of his space shuttle flights as commander, he had the Mars Society's Martian flag hoisted up a mast out of the space shuttle payload bay, and flew the shuttle under the flag of Mars. He later presented the Martian flag that had flown above the space shuttle to Robert Zubrin at a conference of the Mars Society.

In January 2018, Horowitz joined the board of advisors of the DAV foundation.
