= STS-101 =

2000 American crewed spaceflight to the ISS

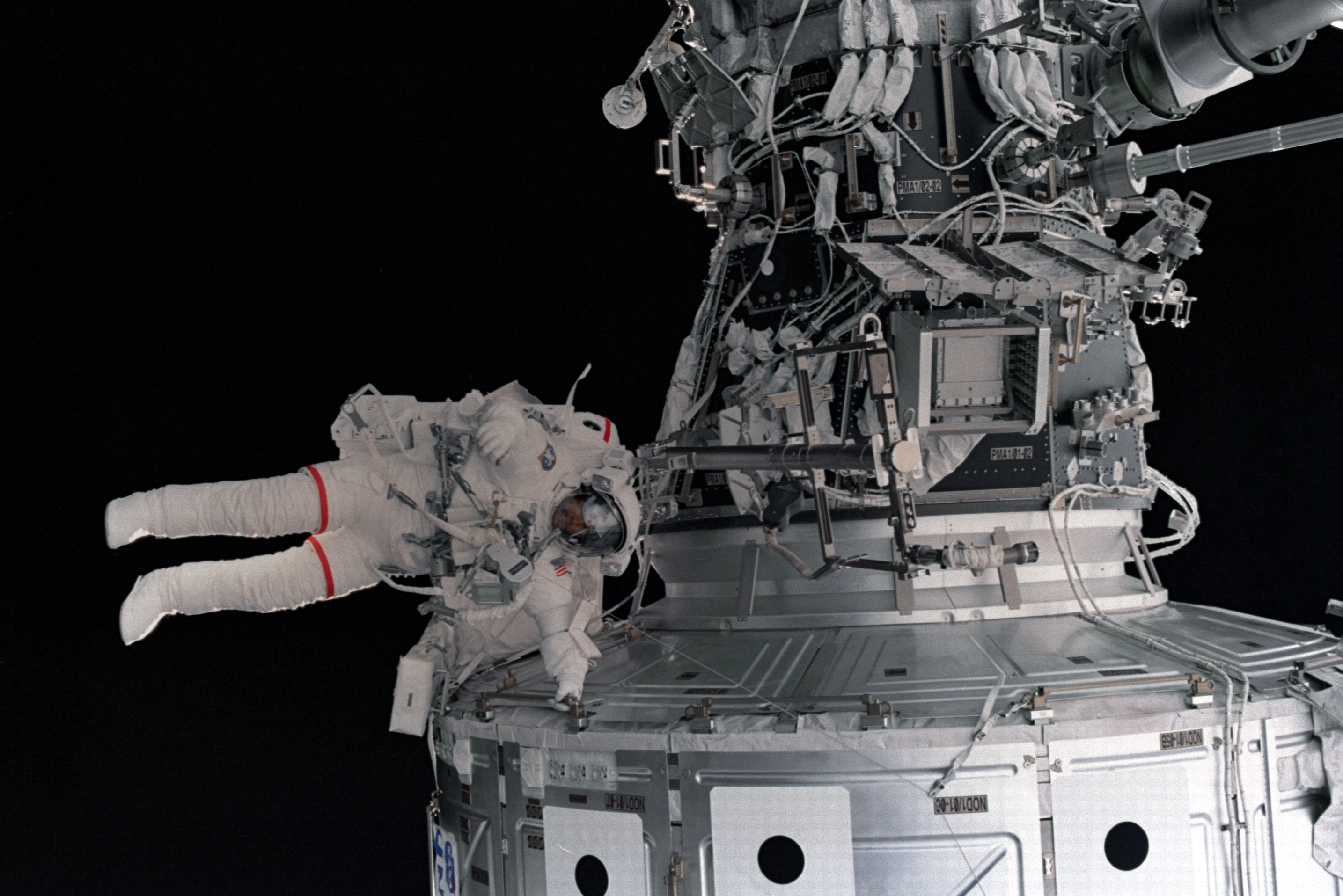
- Williams outside Unity during the mission's sole EVA
- Names: Space Transportation System-101
- Mission type: ISS assembly/logistics
- Operator: NASA
- COSPAR ID: 2000-027A
- SATCAT no.: 26368
- Mission duration: 9 days, 21 hours, 10 minutes, 10 seconds
- Distance travelled: 6.6 million km (4.1 million mi)
- Orbits completed: 155

Spacecraft properties
- Spacecraft: Space Shuttle Atlantis
- Landing mass: 100,369 kg (221,276 lb)
- Payload mass: 1,801 kg (3,971 lb)

Crew
- Crew size: 7
- Members: James D. Halsell; Scott J. Horowitz; Mary E. Weber; Jeffrey N. Williams; James S. Voss; Susan J. Helms; Yuri V. Usachov
- EVAs: 1
- EVA duration: 6 hours, 44 minutes

Start of mission
- Launch date: 19 May 2000, 10:11:10 UTC, 06:11:10 am EDT
- Launch site: Kennedy, LC-39A

End of mission
- Landing date: 29 May 2000, 06:20:19 UTC, 02:20:19 am EDT
- Landing site: Kennedy, SLF Runway 15

Orbital parameters
- Reference system: Geocentric
- Regime: Low Earth
- Perigee altitude: 319 km (198 mi)
- Apogee altitude: 332 km (206 mi)
- Inclination: 51.5°
- Period: 91.04 minutes
- Epoch: 21 May 2000

Docking with ISS
- Docking port: Unity forward (PMA-2)
- Docking date: 21 May 2000, 04:31 UTC
- Undocking date: 26 May 2000, 23:03 UTC
- Time docked: 5 days, 18 hours, 32 minutes
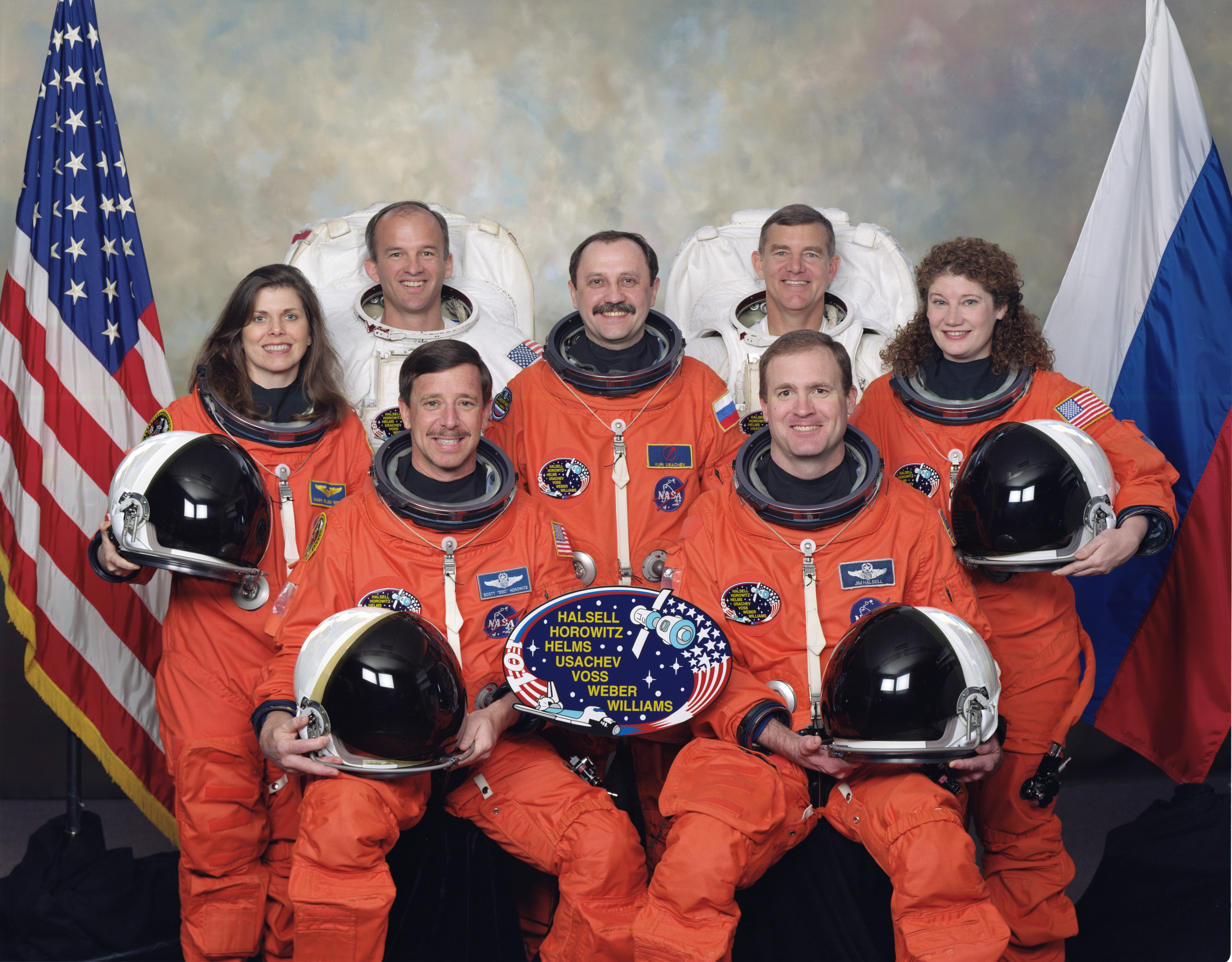
- Standing, from left: Weber, Williams (in white), Usachov, Voss (in white) and Helms; Seated: Halsell and Horowitz Space Shuttle program

STS-101 was a Space Shuttle mission to the International Space Station (ISS) flown by Space Shuttle Atlantis. The mission was a 10-day mission conducted between 19 May 2000 and 29 May 2000. The mission was designated 2A.2a and was a resupply mission to the International Space Station. STS-101 was delayed 3 times in April due to high winds. STS-101 traveled 4.1 million miles and completed 155 revolutions of the earth and landed on runway 15 at Kennedy Space Center. The mission was the first to be flown by a shuttle equipped with a glass cockpit.

== Crew ==
Position	Astronaut
Commander	(United States) James D. Halsell; Fifth and last spaceflight
Pilot	(United States) Scott J. Horowitz; Third spaceflight
Mission Specialist 1	(United States) Mary E. Weber; Second and last spaceflight
Mission Specialist 2 Flight Engineer	(United States) Jeffrey N. Williams; First spaceflight
Mission Specialist 3	(United States) James S. Voss; Fourth spaceflight
Mission Specialist 4	(United States) Susan J. Helms; Fourth spaceflight
Mission Specialist 5	(Russia) Yuri V. Usachov, RSA; Third spaceflight

=== Spacewalks ===
- Voss and Williams – EVA 1
- EVA 1 Start: 22 May 2000 – 01:48 UTC
- EVA 1 End: 22 May 2000 – 08:32 UTC
- Duration: 6 hours, 44 minutes

=== Crew seat assignments ===
Seat	Launch	Landing	Seats 1–4 are on the flight deck. Seats 5–7 are on the mid-deck.
1	Halsell		Seats 1–4 are on the flight deck. Seats 5–7 are on the mid-deck.
2	Horowitz		Seats 1–4 are on the flight deck. Seats 5–7 are on the mid-deck.
3	Weber		Seats 1–4 are on the flight deck. Seats 5–7 are on the mid-deck.
4	Williams		Seats 1–4 are on the flight deck. Seats 5–7 are on the mid-deck.
5	Voss		Seats 1–4 are on the flight deck. Seats 5–7 are on the mid-deck.
6	Helms		Seats 1–4 are on the flight deck. Seats 5–7 are on the mid-deck.
7	Usachov		Seats 1–4 are on the flight deck. Seats 5–7 are on the mid-deck.

== Mission highlights ==
Attempt	Planned	Result	Turnaround	Reason	Decision point	Weather go (%)	Notes
1	24 Apr 2000, 4:17:17 pm	Scrubbed	—	Weather	24 Apr 2000, 4:07 pm (T−00:09:00 hold)	90	Crosswind violations at the Shuttle Landing Facility.
2	25 Apr 2000, 3:53:17 pm	Scrubbed	0 days 23 hours 36 minutes	Weather	25 Apr 2000, 2:19 pm (T−00:41:00)	20	High winds at pad and SLF.
3	26 Apr 2000, 3:29:13 pm	Scrubbed	0 days 23 hours 36 minutes	Weather	26 Apr 2000, 3:29 pm (T−00:09:00 hold)	90	Low clouds and high winds at Transoceanic Abort Sites.
4	19 May 2000, 6:11:10 am	Success	22 days 14 hours 42 minutes			100	Problems with an Atlas III rocket caused further delays.

The flight was originally given the designation "2A.2", serving as a logistics flight to carry cargo to the then-uncrewed space station, in between 2A.1/STS-96 and 3A/STS-92. STS-101 was originally planned to arrive after the Service Module Zvezda, but when Zvezda fell further behind, mission 2A.2 was split into 2A.2a and 2A.2b, the former arriving before Zvezda and the latter arriving after. The original plan for STS-101 was to have crewmembers perform a spacewalk to connect cables to Zvezda, but when the module slipped, so did the EVA, and the three spacewalk crewmembers Lu, Williams, and Malenchenko followed their EVA onto STS-106. Needing three additional crew for STS-101, the Expedition 2 crew of Voss, Helms, and Usachov joined the STS-101 crew for a short mission to their future home.

STS-101 delivered supplies to the International Space Station, hauled up using a Spacehab double module and an Integrated Cargo Carrier pallet. The crew performed a spacewalk and then reboosted the station from 230 miles (370 km) to 250 miles (400 km).

Detailed objectives included ISS ingress/safety to take air samples, monitor carbon dioxide, deploy portable, personal fans, measure air flow, rework/modify ISS ducting, replace air filters, and replace Zarya fire extinguishers and smoke detectors. Critical replacements, repairs and spares were also done to replace four suspect batteries on Zarya, replace failed or suspect electronics for Zarya's batteries, replace Radio Telemetry System memory unit, replace port early communications antenna, replace Radio Frequency Power Distribution Box and clear Space Vision System target.

The mission also included incremental assembly/upgrades such as assembly of Strela crane, installation of additional exterior handrails, set up of center-line camera cable, installation of "Komparus" cable inserts and reseating the U.S. crane. Assembly parts, tools and equipment were also transferred to the station and equipment stowed for future missions.

The station was also resupplied with water, a docking mechanism accessory kit, film and video tape for documentation, office supplies and personal items. Crew health maintenance items were also transferred including exercise equipment, medical support supplies, formaldehyde monitor kit and a passive dosimetry system.

This mission was almost similar to the Columbia disaster. A damaged tile seam caused a breach which allowed superheated gas to enter the left wing during reentry. The gas did not penetrate deeply and the damage was repaired before the next flight. If it had penetrated deeply the Shuttle could have been destroyed during reentry.

This mission was the first mission to fly with a glass cockpit.

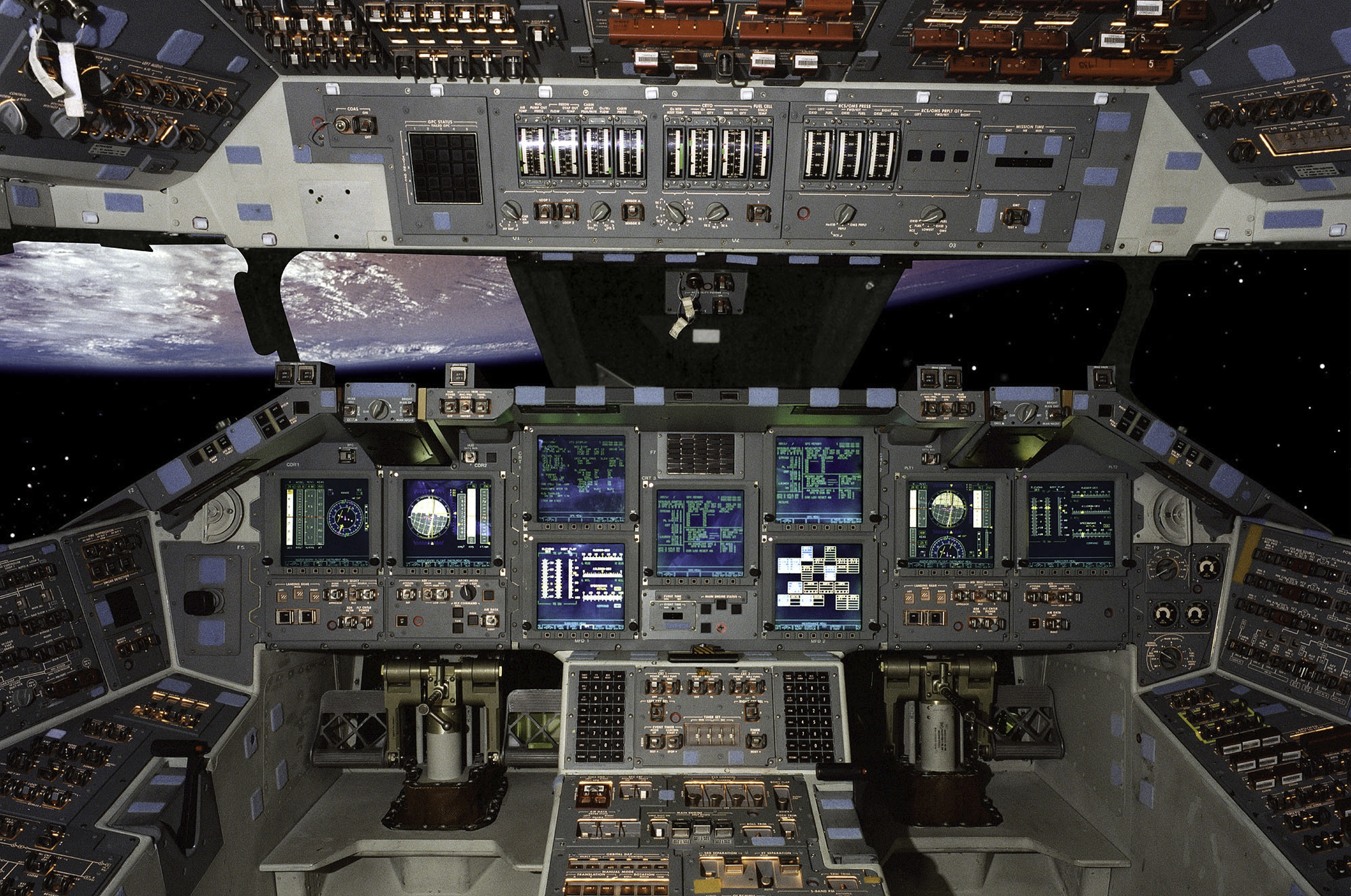
During STS-101, Atlantis was the first Shuttle to fly with a glass cockpit.

Almost 26 years later, one of the Orbital Maneuvering System engines on Atlantis flew on the Artemis II mission, the first crewed mission beyond Low Earth Orbit since Apollo 17 in 1972.

== Wake-up calls ==
NASA began a tradition of playing music to astronauts during the Gemini program, which was first used to wake up a flight crew during Apollo 15. Each track is specially chosen, often by their families, and usually has a special meaning to an individual member of the crew, or is applicable to their daily activities.

Flight Day	Song	Artist	Played for
Day 2	"Free Fallin'"	Tom Petty	Susan Helms
Day 3	"Lookin' Out the Window"	Stevie Ray Vaughan	
Day 4	"Haunted House"	Roy Buchanan	
Day 5	"I Only Have Eyes for You"	The Flamingos	Jim Halsell
Day 6	"I'm Gonna Fly"	Amy Grant	Scott Horowitz
Day 7	"Don't It Make You Wanna Dance"	Jerry Jeff Walker	Jeffrey Williams
Day 8	"Your Noble Highness, Lady Luck" (Russian: Ваше благородие, госпожа Удача, lit. 'Vashe blagorodye, gospozha Udacha')	Bulat Shalvovich	Yuri Usachov
Day 9	"25 or 6 to 4"	Chicago	
Day 10	"El Capitan"	John Philip Sousa	

== Gallery ==
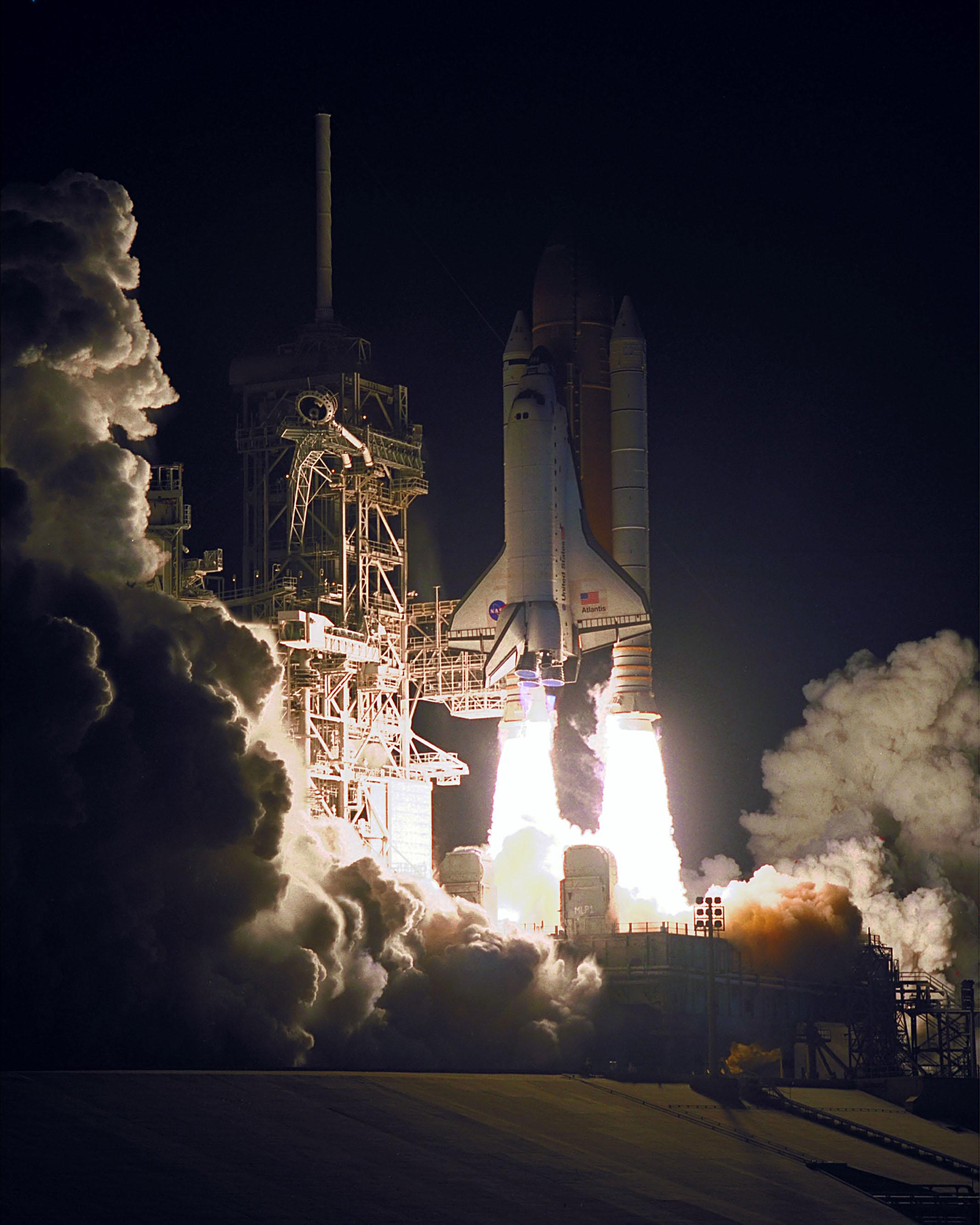
Atlantis after SRB igntition

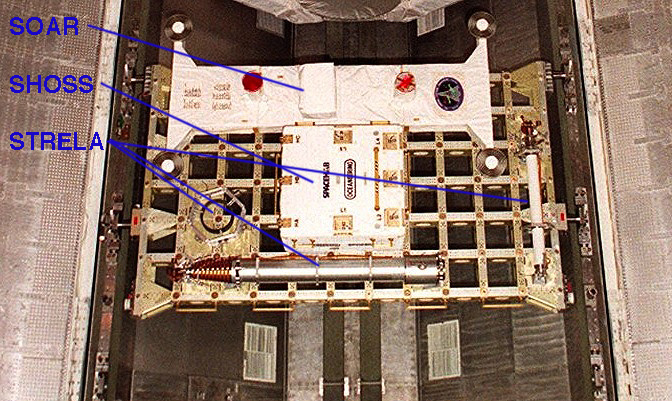
ICC STS-101 with SOAR, SHOSS Box, and Strela

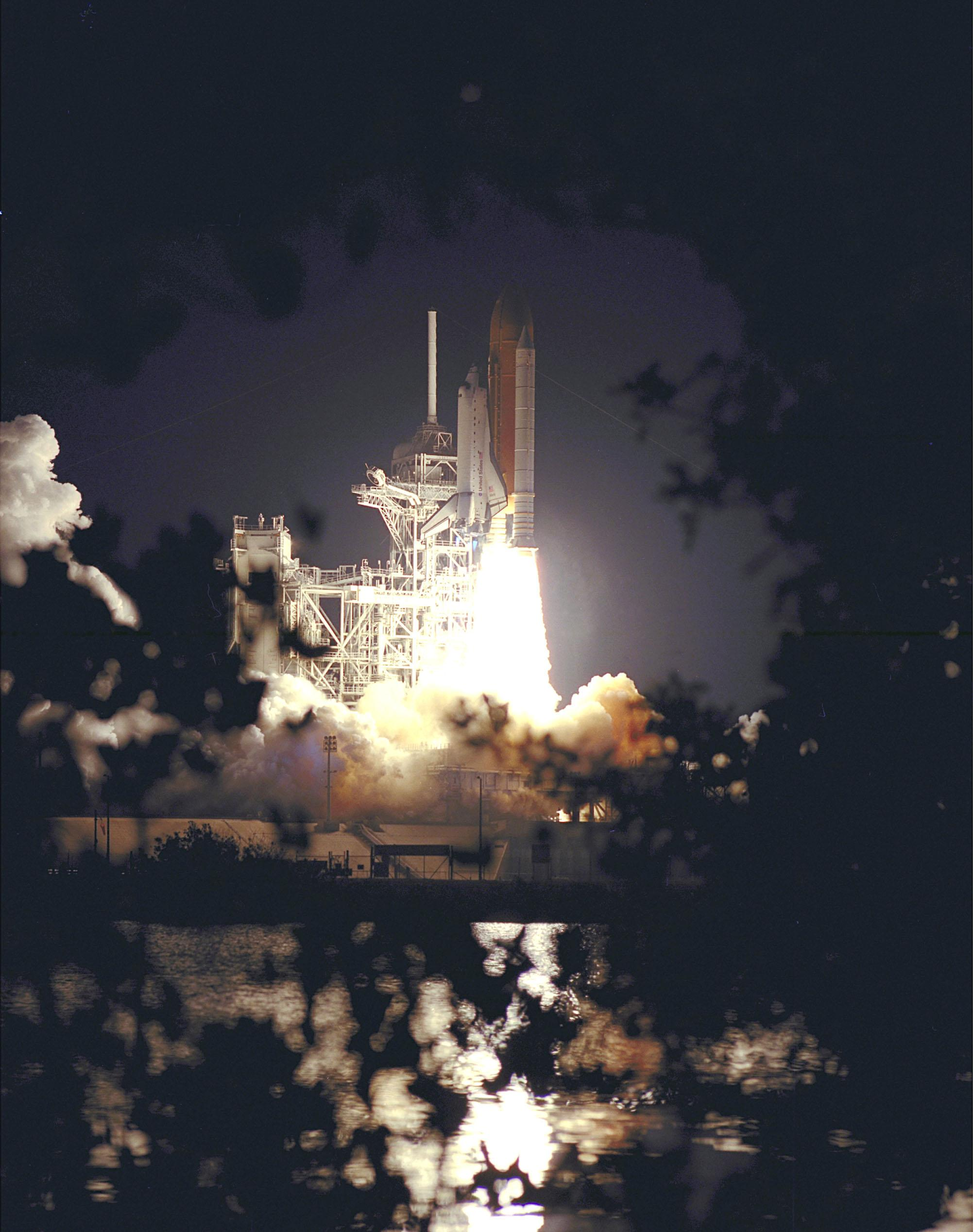
STS-101 launches from Kennedy Space Center, 19 May 2000.

Illustration of the ISS during STS-101

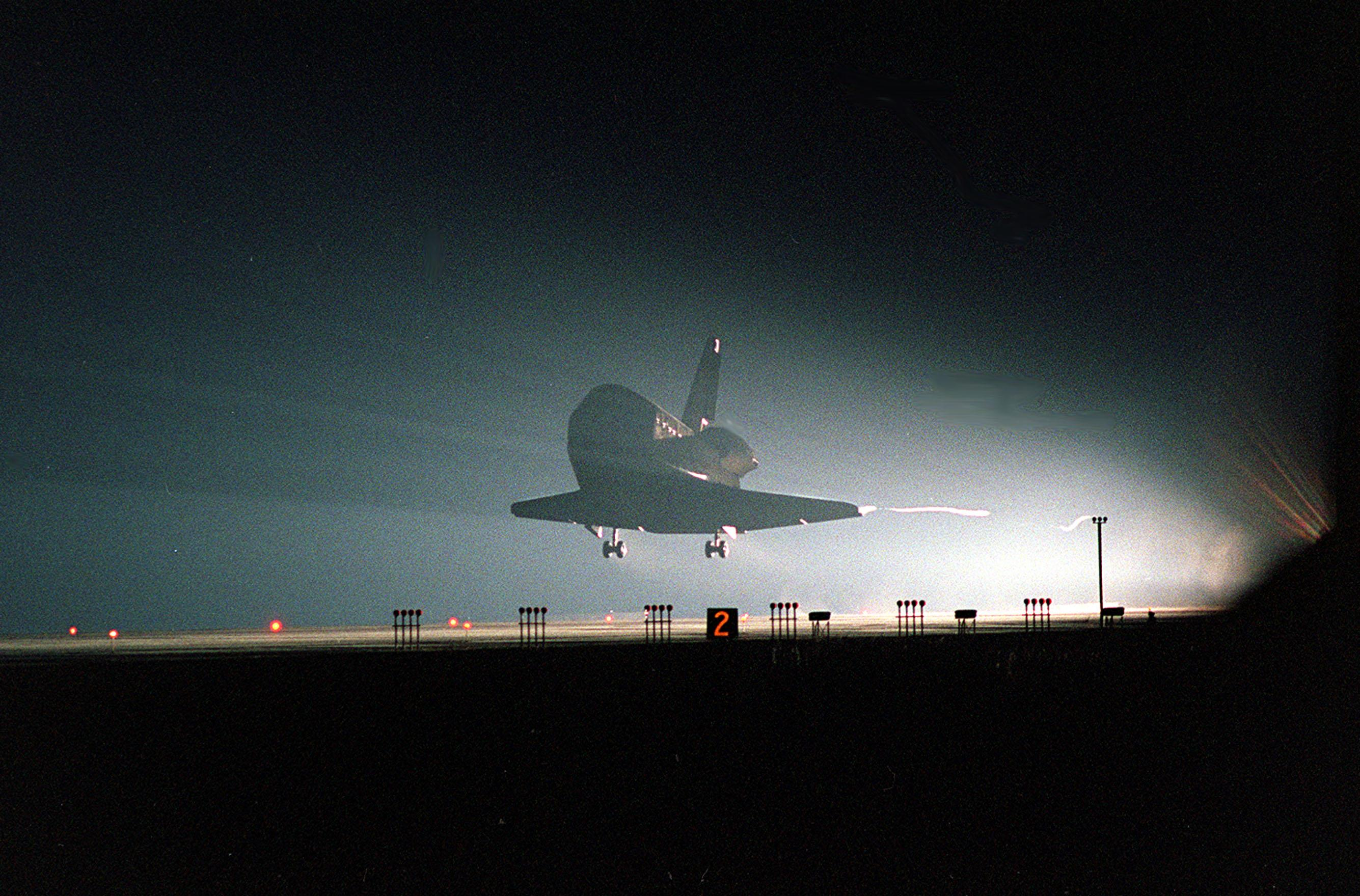
STS-101 landing at the Shuttle Landing Facility, 29 May 2000.

== See also ==
- List of human spaceflights
- List of International Space Station spacewalks
- List of Space Shuttle missions
- List of spacewalks and moonwalks 1965–1999
- Outline of space science
