= Space sexology =

Scientific study of extraterrestrial intimacy and sexuality

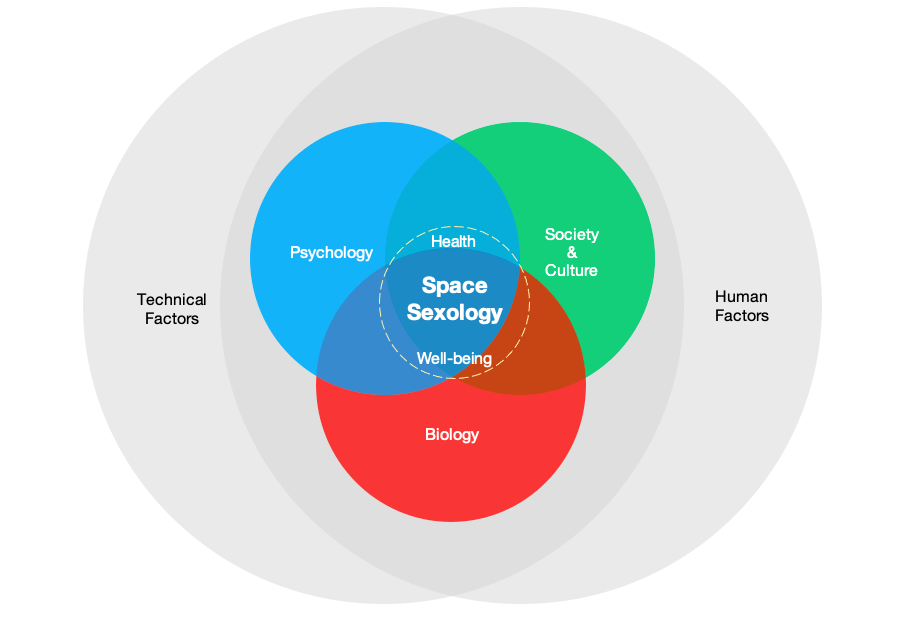
Dubé and colleagues' (2021) biopsychosocial model for space sexology

Space sexology has been defined as the "comprehensive scientific study of extraterrestrial intimacy and sexuality". It aims to holistically understand intimacy and sexuality in space, including its risks, and potential benefits for the health and well-being of those who travel beyond our home planet. Historically, space organizations such as NASA have not studied sexuality in space, though scientists and researchers have called for studies in this area for decades.

== History ==
Spokespeople for space organizations, such as NASA, have historically gone on record expressing that they do not study sexuality in space. Bill Jeffs, the spokesperson for NASA's Johnson Space Center, has stated that: "We don't study sexuality in space, and we don't have any studies ongoing with that. If that's [your] specific topic, there's nothing to discuss". Some researchers and scientists have argued that decisions made by space organizations are often heavily influenced by the sociocultural norms of their benefactors. As such, they posit that sexually conservative ideologies may hinder furthering the study of space sexology. Given the persistent lack of research on human sexuality and intimacy in space, scientists and researchers have called for studies in this area for decades.

In 1989, Roy Levin wrote the first paper exploring the potential effects of space travel on human sexuality and the human reproductive system, and called attention to the lack of research in this area.

In 1998, Ray Noonan wrote the first philosophical inquiry on human intimacy and sexuality for extended spaceflights. In his doctoral thesis, Noonan discussed possible sexological challenges faced by astronauts on long-duration missions and related implications for mission success. Expanding on his own work, Noonan proposed in 2001 that space agencies should collaborate with scientific communities to form programs to study sex in space.

In 2005, Shimizu and colleagues echoed this belief, arguing that human sexuality research was crucial in order to successfully envision a future in space.

In her 2006 book entitled "Sex in Space", Laura Woodmansee explored questions relating to interstellar intercourse, from sexual mechanics, to conception, pregnancy, and birth in low gravity situations. She further emphasized the need for extraterrestrial sex research.

In 2016, Alexander Layendecker shed light on the absence of human sex research conducted by the NASA. He further advocated for the development of an Astrosexological Research Institute. Layendecker raised important questions regarding the possible effects of space conditions (e.g., exposure, radiation, microgravity, etc.) on phenomena such as conception, pregnancy, and child development.

In 2018, Alexander Layendecker and Shawna Pandya co-wrote "Logistics of Reproduction in Space". In it, they present the body of research that has been produced on topics of human sexuality, reproduction and development in space. They also explored some of the logistical challenges associated with these topics. However, they concluded that the literature on such topics remains scarce, and that there is not enough data to assert whether conception, gestation, and development can safely (or successfully) occur in space.

In 2021, Dubé and colleagues highlighted the importance of considering space sexology as a scientific field and research program. Noting a significant lack of research related to space intimacy and sexuality, their article titled "The Case for Space Sexology" explores the risks and benefits of studying these basic human needs in an extraterrestrial context. They posit that the use of a biopsychosocial framework could expedite and improve research among space organizations while contributing to the health and well-being of future space inhabitants. Since the publication, the authors have commented on the growth of support among the research community and space sector for the advancement of space sexology. For example, Maria Santaguida, co-author of the article, stated in an interview with Mic that: "More and more researchers around the globe and people working in the space sector recognize that addressing human intimate and sexual needs in space is one of the keys to unlocking our long-term expansion into the universe".

In 2023, Santaguida and Dubé published a five year review consolidating existing research on sexual health in space, highlighting the fragmented areas of the field and calling for systematic changes to the way sexology and the study of intimacy and reproduction is studied (Santaguida & Dubé, 2023).

It has been argued that NASA's rigid stance on sexuality in space may be softening. When asked to comment on Dubé and colleagues' "The Case for Space Sexology" by a MIC journalist, a NASA representative stated that "Should a future need for more in-depth study on reproductive health in space be identified, NASA would take the appropriate steps." In contrast with NASA's historically blunt rejections of proposals regarding sex and space, this response has been interpreted as a signal of change – one which may open the door for future exploration of human sexuality in space.

== Recent Research ==
In 2024, Dr. Begum Mathyk and her colleagues at the University of South Florida published work on women's reproductive health in space as a part of the Space Omics and Medical Atlas initiative, the first of its kind. Their studies examined microgravity and radiation exposure and its effects on female reproductive biology. This was one of the first OBGYN led investigations into space health (USF Health, 2024).

Other recent studies have emphasized the challenges of sexual activity in microgravity, including the difficulty of maintaining physical contact and the potential need for specialized equipment or protocols when it comes to facilitating intimacy (New Space Economy, 2024).

== Anticipated risks and benefits of sexuality in space ==
Dubé et al. (2021) proposed that space organizations should embrace the discipline of space sexology to enhance the benefits and mitigate the risks of human sexuality and intimacy in space. The researchers described risks associated with the physical and chemical properties of space environments, such as the effects of ionizing radiation and gravitational changes on fertility, conception, pregnancy and fetal/child development. Biological risks have been noted when looking at potential impacts of cosmic radiation. Research has shown that gametes and embryonic development have been affected, and has further raised concerns about fertility and long-term genetic health. Ethically, the need to prevent sexual harassment and ensure informed consent in confined, high-stress environments are strong and important concerns (FreeAstroScience, 2024).

Other risks are related to the intimacy and needs of space-travelers, such as the limited privacy on spacecraft, hygienic concerns, long-term isolation and mental health repercussions arising from lack of sexual fulfilment. Dubé and colleagues (2021) also expressed concern over the potential sexual violence and harassment as these acts have already occurred in space simulation contexts. This concern was reiterated by Santaguida and colleagues (2022) who argued that it is “time to plan for #MeToo in space.” For example, Judith Lapierre, co-author of the article, experienced sexual harassment on a 110-day experiment on a Mir Space Station replica. Less than a month into the experiment, Lapierre was non-consensually grabbed and kissed by a Russian crew member who oversaw the mission. She was also subjected to other forms of sexist behaviors by her male colleagues. While discussing these events in another publication, Lapierre stated: "It is time, more than ever, to meet the real challenges of space exploration, with honesty, transparency, and by recognizing that Earth's unacceptable behaviors are also Space's unacceptable behaviors for a spacefaring civilization".

Dubé and colleagues (2021) identified several benefits that could accompany studying sex in space, noting that such benefits directly impact the health and well-being of astronauts. These ideas are supported by research on the positive effects of sexual activity on physiological and psychological functioning. Physiologically, sex can reduce stress levels, lower blood pressure, improve sleep quality, enhance immune functioning, and support cardiovascular health (Brody, 2010; Dubé & Santaguida, 2021). Psychologically, sexual activity and masturbation were met with improved mood, self-esteem, and body image while also relieving tension and stress (Levin, 2007). Looking past the health of an individual, intimacy, in its many forms, may provide social benefits by strengthening bonds and creating trust and cooperation among crew members, which could reduce conflict and enhance teamwork in confined, high-stakes environments, like those that are seen in space exploration (Dubé & Santaguida, 2021). Scholars argue that these physiological, psychological, and social benefits could play a crucial role in ensuring astronaut well-being and mission success during long-duration spaceflight.

== Potential solutions to the challenges of space sexology ==
Space organizations have historically avoided sex-related research. Dubé et al. (2021) proposed that space organizations should be reminded of the risks of limiting sex and intimacy in space while highlighting the potential benefits of enabling them. They argue that organizations are ultimately responsible for the health and well-being of their astronauts and as such, intimate and sexual needs ought not be overlooked. However, they indicate that successfully researching space sexology will likely require cooperation and contributions from both space organizations and their astronauts. They acknowledge that this may prove challenging, as conflicting sexual views between administrators and astronauts alike could complicate group cohesion.

Potential solutions to the challenges of intimacy and sexuality in space have been shown in biological, psychological, and social areas of study. Scholars claim that premeditated planning can be essential to maintaining astronaut health and mission success. Biologically, new research has suggested that specialized medical protocols might be needed to monitor fertility, gamete health, and embryonic development in microgravity and radiation-heavy environments for women to maintain long term reproductive health. Preventive measures like shielding, assisted reproductive technologies, and cryopreservation of gametes have been discussed as possible strategies to mitigate risks that come from long term spaceflight and the overall wear and tear that comes from high stress operations (Santaguida & Dubé, 2023).

Psychologically, solutions focus on ensuring privacy, stress relief, and emotional support during long-duration missions. Providing astronauts with access to sexual health resources, including masturbation aids or virtual intimacy technologies, has been suggested as a way to reduce tension and promote well-being (Levin, 2007). Counseling and mental health support systems may also help manage team conflict.

Socially and ethically, scholars argue that clear policies need to be established to prevent harassment, ensure consent, and regulate sexual relationships in confined environments. Crew training in communication, conflict resolution, and ethical guidelines could reduce risks of coercion, favoritism, or unsafe power imbalances. Some researchers have proposed the creation of an “astrosexology framework” that would integrate intimacy into space medicine and mission planning, helping to ensure that sexual health is treated as a legitimate component of astronaut care (Dubé & Santaguida, 2021).

== See also ==
- Sex in space
- Space tourism
- Space medicine
- Space colonization
- Space advocacy
- Effect of spaceflight on the human body
