= Document 12-571-3570 =

Fictional NASA document

Document 12-571-3570 (also titled NASA No. 12 571-3570) is a hoax document originally posted to the Usenet newsgroup alt.sex on November 28, 1989. According to this document, astronauts aboard Space Shuttle mission STS-75 performed a variety of sex acts to determine which positions are most effective in zero gravity. The document goes on to report that of the 10 positions tested, six required the use of a belt and an inflatable tunnel, while four were contingent on hanging on. The document also discusses a video record of the 10 one-hour sessions in the lower deck of the shuttle, and notes that the subjects added their own personal footnotes to help scientists.

The real STS-75 mission occurred in 1996—seven years after the text was published—clearly indicating that the document is a hoax. Nonetheless, many people have been fooled by this document and NASA has had to debunk it on several occasions. In March 2000, NASA's director of media services Brian Welch referred to the document as a "fairly well-known 'urban legend'".

This fictional document was rediscovered and widely publicized by astronomer and scientific writer Pierre Kohler, who used it as a major source about sex experiments in space in his 2000 book, The Final Mission. Kohler conceded in his book that astronauts are mute on the subject of human sex in orbit, even if they have conducted reproduction research on South African frogs and Japanese fish.

== See also ==
- Sex in space
