= Jeffrey A. Hoffman =

American astronaut (born 1944)

Jeffrey Hoffman
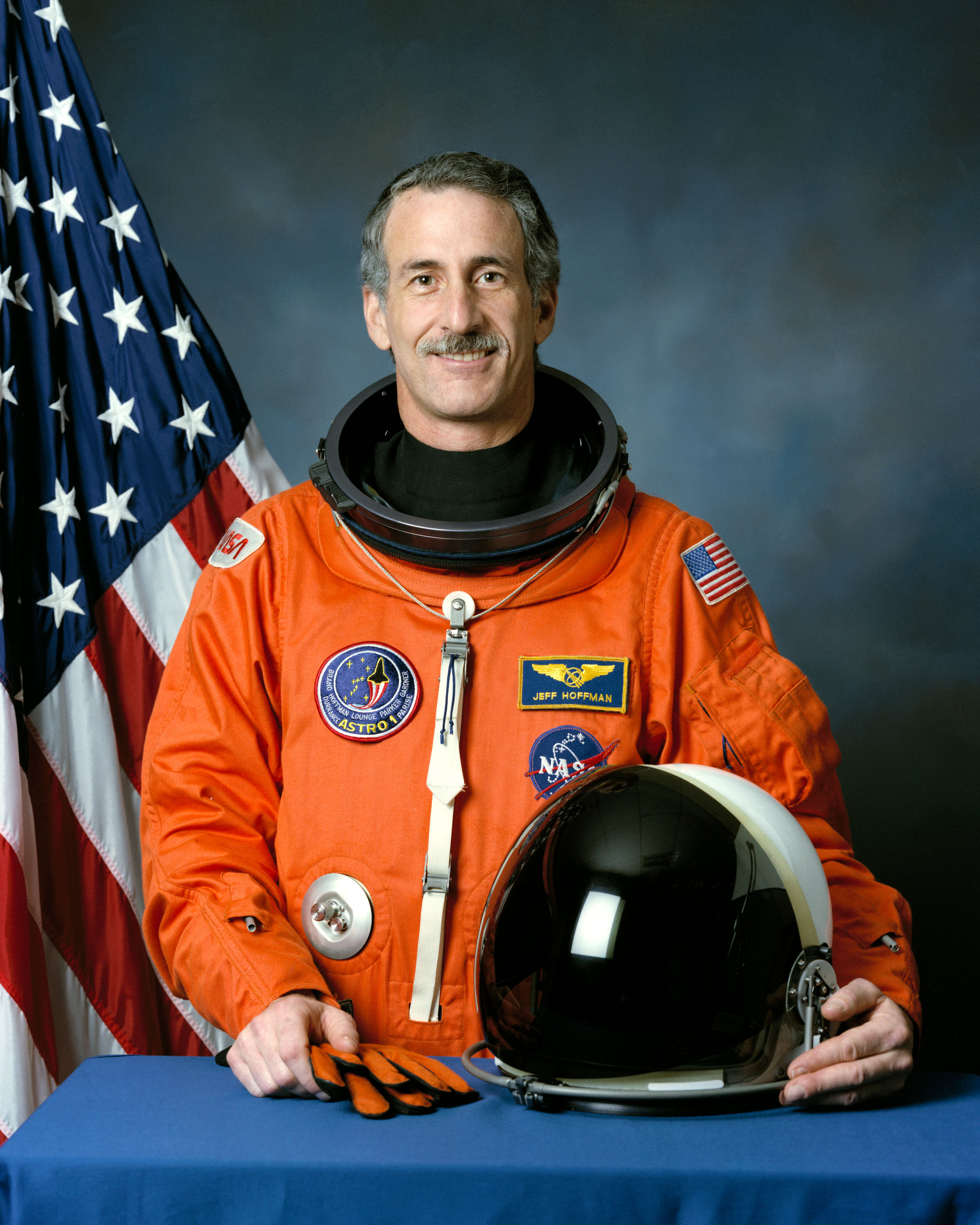
- Born: Jeffrey Alan Hoffman; November 2, 1944 (age 81); New York City, New York, U.S.
- Education: Amherst College (BA); Harvard University (MS, PhD); Rice University (MS)
- Space career

NASA astronaut
- Time in space: 50d 11h 54m
- Selection: NASA Group 8 (1978)
- Total EVAs: 4
- Total EVA time: 25h, 08m
- Missions: STS-51-D; STS-35; STS-46; STS-61; STS-75

Jeffrey Alan Hoffman (born November 2, 1944) is an American former NASA astronaut and currently a professor of aeronautics and astronautics at the Massachusetts Institute of Technology.

Hoffman made five flights as a Space Shuttle astronaut, including the first mission to repair the Hubble Space Telescope in 1993, when the orbiting telescope's flawed optical system was corrected. Trained as an astrophysicist, he also flew on the 1990 Spacelab Shuttle mission that featured the Astro-1 ultraviolet astronomical observatory in the Shuttle's payload bay. Over the course of his five missions he logged more than 1,211 hours and 21.5 million miles in space. He was also NASA's second Jewish astronaut, and the second Jewish man in space after Soviet cosmonaut Boris Volynov.

== Background ==
Hoffman was born November 2, 1944, in Brooklyn, New York, but considers Scarsdale, New York, to be his hometown. He graduated from Scarsdale High School in 1962. He received a Bachelor of Arts degree (summa cum laude) in astronomy from Amherst College in 1966, a Doctor of Philosophy in astrophysics from Harvard University in 1971, and a Master of Science degree in materials science from Rice University in 1988. Hoffman is an Eagle Scout.

Hoffman is a member of the International Academy of Astronautics, the International Astronomical Union, the American Institute of Aeronautics and Astronautics, the American Astronomical Society, the Spanish Academy of Engineering, Phi Beta Kappa, and Sigma Xi.

As of 2005 he is co-director of the Massachusetts Space Grant Consortium and a professor of the Practice in the Department of Aeronautics and Astronautics at MIT.

== Academic experience ==
Hoffman's original research interests were in high-energy astrophysics, specifically cosmic gamma ray and x-ray astronomy. His doctoral work at Harvard was the design, construction, testing, and flight of a balloon-borne, low-energy, gamma ray telescope.

From 1972 to 1975, during post-doctoral work at the University of Leicester in the United Kingdom, he worked on several x-ray astronomy rocket payloads. He also designed and supervised the construction and testing of the test equipment for use in an x-ray beam facility which he used to measure the scattering and reflectivity properties of x-ray concentrating mirrors. During his last year at Leicester, he was project scientist for the medium-energy x-ray experiment on the European Space Agency's EXOSAT satellite and played a leading role in the proposal and design studies for this project.

He worked in the Center for Space Research at the Massachusetts Institute of Technology (MIT) from 1975 to 1978 as project scientist in charge of the orbiting HEAO-1 A4 hard x-ray and gamma ray experiment, launched in August 1977. His involvement included pre-launch design of the data analysis system, supervising its operation post-launch, and directing the MIT team undertaking the scientific analysis of flight data being returned. He was also involved extensively in analysis of x-ray data from the SAS-3 satellite being operated by MIT. His principal research was the study of x-ray bursts, about which he authored or co-authored more than 20 papers.

He joined the MIT Aeronautics and Astronautics faculty in 2001 as a senior lecturer, and since 2002 has been a professor of the Practice in that department. His research specialties include human space flight operations, space flight technology, human-machine interactions, extravehicular activity, and conducting laboratory research in space. His teaching interests include space systems design and space policy. Dr. Hoffman instructed a course in systems engineering on the space shuttle that is available for free in video format from academic earth.

== NASA experience ==
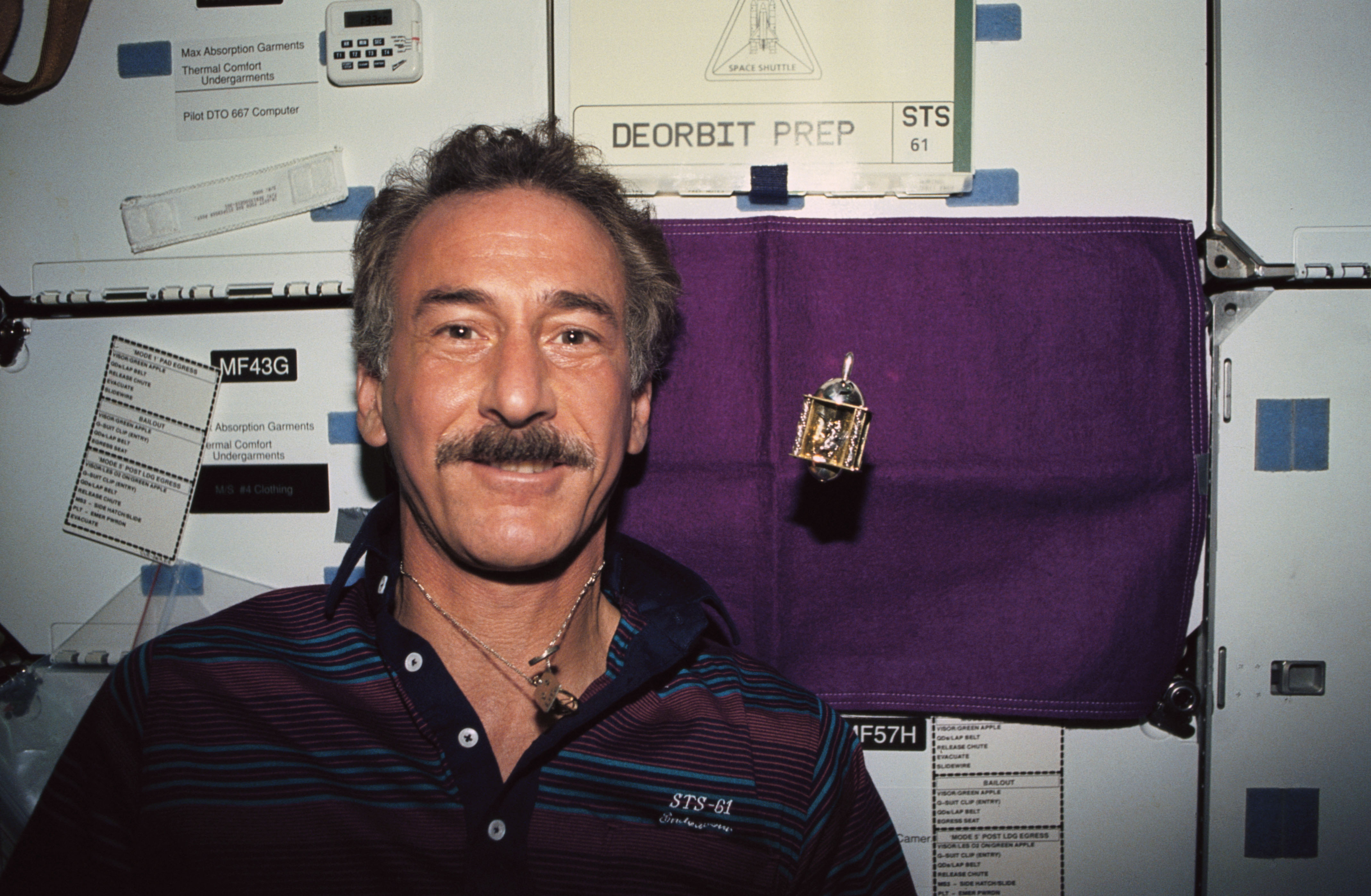
Hoffman and the Dreidel he brought into space

Selected by NASA in January 1978, Hoffman became an astronaut in August 1979. During preparations for the Shuttle Orbital Flight Tests, he worked in the Flight Simulation Laboratory at Downey, California, testing guidance, navigation and flight control systems. He worked with the orbital maneuvering and reaction control systems, with Shuttle navigation, with crew training, and with the development of satellite deployment procedures. Hoffman served as a support crewmember for STS-5 and as a CAPCOM (spacecraft communicator) for the STS-8 and STS-82 missions. He also worked on EVA, including the development of a high-pressure spacesuit, and preparations for the assembly of the Space Station. Hoffman was a co-founder of the Astronaut Office Science Support Group. In 1996 he led the Payload and Habitability Branch of the Astronaut Office.

Among the Jewish items he took into space were a Dreidel, which he spun for an hour, a Mezuzah, which he attached to the space station bunk bed he and fellow Jewish astronaut Scott J. Horowitz alternately used, and a Hanukkah menorah.

Hoffman left the astronaut program in July 1997 to become NASA's European Representative in Paris, where he served until August 2001. His principal duties were to keep NASA and NASA's European partners informed about each other's activities, try to resolve problems in US-European cooperative space projects, search for new areas of US-European space cooperation, and represent NASA in European media. In August 2001, Hoffman was seconded by NASA to the Massachusetts Institute of Technology, where he is a professor in the Department of Aeronautics and Astronautics. He is engaged in several research projects using the International Space Station and teaches courses on space operations and design.

== Space flight experience ==
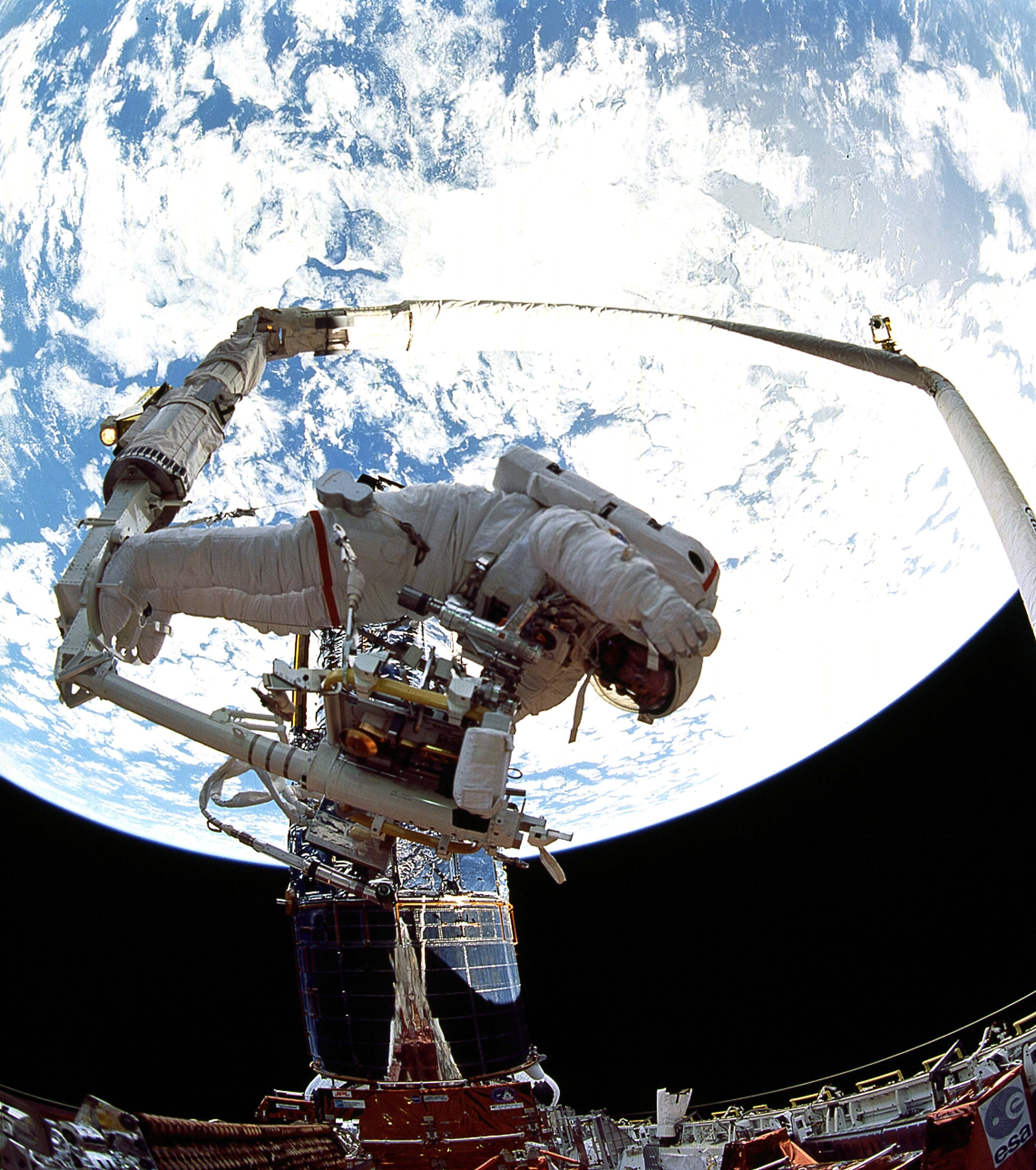
Hoffman repairing the Hubble during STS-61

- STS 51-D (April 12–19, 1985)
- STS-35 (December 2–10, 1990)
- STS-46 (July 31 – August 8, 1992)
- STS-61 (December 2–13, 1993)
- STS-75 (February 22 – March 9, 1996)

Hoffman made his first space flight as a mission specialist on STS 51-D, April 12–19, 1985, on the Space Shuttle Discovery. On this mission, he made the first STS contingency spacewalk, in an attempted rescue of a malfunctioning satellite.

Hoffman made his second space flight as a mission specialist on STS-35, December 2–10, 1990, on the Space Shuttle Columbia. This Spacelab mission featured the ASTRO-1 ultraviolet astronomy laboratory, a project on which Hoffman had worked since 1982.

Hoffman made his third space flight as payload commander and mission specialist on STS-46, July 31 – August 8, 1992, on the Space Shuttle Atlantis. On this mission, the crew deployed the European Retrievable Carrier, an ESA-sponsored free-flying science platform, and carried out the first test flight of the Tethered Satellite System (TSS), a joint project between NASA and the Italian Space Agency. Hoffman had worked on the Tethered Satellite project since 1987.

Hoffman made his fourth flight as an EVA crewmember on STS-61, December 2–13, 1993, on the Space Shuttle Endeavour. During this flight, the Hubble Space Telescope was captured, serviced, and restored to full capacity through a record five spacewalks by four astronauts, including Hoffman. Hoffman also spun a dreidel for the holiday of Hanukkah to a live audience watching via satellite.

Hoffman last flew on STS-75 (February 22 – March 9, 1996) on the Space Shuttle Columbia. This was a 16-day mission whose principal payloads were the reflight of the Tethered Satellite System and the third flight of the United States Microgravity Payload. The TSS successfully demonstrated the ability of tethers to produce electricity. The TSS experiment produced a wealth of new information on the electrodynamics of tethers and plasma physics before the tether broke at 19.7 km, just shy of the 20.7 km goal. The crew also worked around the clock performing combustion experiments and research related to microgravity investigations. During this mission, Hoffman became the first astronaut to log 1000 hours aboard the Space Shuttle. Hoffman took with him a small Torah scroll, and he read from the Book of Genesis during the flight. The documentary film Space Torah released in 2023, is centered around this event.

With the completion of his fifth space flight, Hoffman has logged more than 1,211 hours and 21.5 million miles in space.

== After NASA ==
Since 2002, he has been a professor in the Department of Aeronautics and Astronautics at the Massachusetts Institute of Technology.

Since 2008 he has also been a visiting professor in the Department of Physics and Astronomy at the University of Leicester.

He is the author of a book titled An Astronaut's Diary ISBN 978-0-936897-00-4 (June 1986) which is accompanied by a cassette tape. The audio tape contains excerpts of the original recordings he made with a pocket tape recorder.

Hoffman is a visiting lecturer at the International Space University.

== Awards and honors ==
- Amherst College 1963 Porter Prize in Astronomy
- 1964 Second Walker Prize in Mathematics
- 1965 John Summer Runnells Scholarship Prize
- 1966 Stanley V. and Charles B. Travis Prize
- Woods Prize for Scholarship
- Elected to Phi Beta Kappa in 1965 and Sigma Xi in 1966
- Woodrow Wilson Foundation Pre-Doctoral Fellowship, 1966–67
- National Science Foundation Pre-Doctoral Fellowship, 1966–1971
- National Academy of Sciences Post-Doctoral Visiting Fellowship, 1971–72
- Harvard University Sheldon International Fellowship, 1972–73
- NATO Post-Doctoral Fellowship, 1973–74
- NASA Space Flight Medals (5)
- NASA Exceptional Service Medals (2)
- NASA Distinguished Service Medals (2)
- V. M. Komarov and the Sergei P. Korolev Diplomas by the International Aeronautical Federation in 1991 and 1994
- Inducted into the Astronaut Hall of Fame in 2007

== See also ==
- History of the Jews in Houston
