= Sex in space =

An educational video about the challenges to sex posed by a zero-gravity environment

The conditions governing sex in space (intercourse, conception and procreation while weightless) have become a study due to plans for long-duration space missions, as well as the future potential accommodation of sexual partners aboard the International Space Station (ISS). Issues explored include disrupted circadian rhythms, radiation, isolation, stress, and the physical acts of intercourse in zero or minimal gravity.

Although it remains hypothetical, sex in space is the primary object of study of space sexology.

== Overview ==
Human sexual activity in the weightlessness of outer space presents difficulties due to Newton's third law. According to the law, if the couple remain attached, their movements will counter each other. Consequently, their actions will not change their velocity unless they are affected by another, unattached, object. Some difficulty could occur due to drifting into other objects. If the couple have a combined velocity relative to other objects, collisions could occur. The discussion of sex in space has also raised the issue of conception and pregnancy in space.

As of 2009, with NASA planning lunar outposts and possibly long-duration missions, the topic has taken a respectable place in life sciences. Despite this, some researchers have argued that national and private space agencies have yet to develop any concrete research and plans to address human sexuality in space. Dubé and colleagues (2021) proposed that NASA should embrace the discipline of space sexology by integrating sex research into their Human Research Program. Santaguida and colleagues (2022) have further argued that space agencies and private companies should invest in this discipline to address the potential for sexual harassment and assault in space contexts.

== Physiological issues ==
Numerous physiological changes have been noted during spaceflight, many of which may affect sex and procreation, notably circulation and the flow of blood within the body. Such potential effects would likely be caused by a culmination of factors, including gravitational changes, planetary and space radiation, noise, vibration, social isolation, disrupted circadian rhythms, or mental and physical stress.

=== Gravity and microgravity ===
The primary issue to be considered in off-Earth reproduction is the lack of gravitational acceleration. Life on Earth, and thus the reproductive and ontogenetic processes of all life, evolved under the constant influence of the Earth's 1g gravitational field. It is important to study how space environment affects critical phases of mammalian reproduction and development, as well as the events surrounding fertilization, embryogenesis, pregnancy, birth, postnatal maturation, and parental care.

Studies conducted on rats revealed that, although the fetus developed properly once exposed to normal gravity, rats raised in microgravity lacked the ability to right themselves. Another study examined mouse embryo fertilization in microgravity. Although this resulted in healthy mice, once implanted at normal gravity, the fertilization rate was lower for the embryos fertilized in microgravity. As of 2006, no mice or rats had developed while in microgravity throughout the entire life cycle.

In 2006, American novelist Vanna Bonta invented the 2suit, a garment designed to facilitate sex in weightless environments such as outer space, or on planets with low gravity. The 2suit was made of a lightweight fabric, with a Velcro-lined exterior, which would enable two people to securely embrace. However, Bonta stressed that the 2suit was versatile, and was not intended for the sole purpose of sex. Functionality testing was conducted in 2008 by Bonta aboard G-Force One, a low gravity simulator. It took eight attempts for the two test participants (Bonta and her husband) to embrace one another. According to science author Mark Thompson, the 2suit was cumbersome but moderately successful, and it is not clear whether or not it will have practical value for future space travelers. The 2suit has been covered in the TV series The Universe as well as a 2008 History Channel television documentary. It has also been discussed by online writers.

== History of attempts ==
NASA has stated that it knows of no one who has had intercourse in space.

=== Planned attempts ===
In June 2015, Pornhub announced its plans to make the first pornographic film in space. It launched a crowdfunding campaign to fund the effort, dubbed Sexploration, with the goal of raising $3.4 million in 60 days. The campaign only received pledges for $236,086. If funded, the film would have been slated for a 2016 release, following six months of training for the two performers and six-person crew. Though it claimed to be in talks with multiple private spaceflight carriers, the company declined to name names "for fear that would risk unnecessary fallout" from the carriers. A Space.com article about the campaign mentioned that in 2008, Virgin Galactic received and rejected a $1 million offer from an undisclosed party to shoot a sex film on board SpaceShipTwo.

Adult film actress CoCo Brown had begun certifying for a co-pilot seat in the XCOR Lynx spaceplane, which would have launched in a suborbital flight in 2016 and spent a short amount of time in zero-gravity. However, XCOR Aerospace declared bankruptcy before ever flying a space tourist.

Short of actual space, the adult entertainment production company Private Media Group has filmed a movie called The Uranus Experiment: Part Two where an actual zero-gravity intercourse scene was accomplished with a reduced-gravity aircraft. The filming process was particularly difficult from a technical and logistical standpoint. Budget constraints allowed for only one 20-second shot, featuring the actors Silvia Saint and Nick Lang.

== In popular culture ==
Science fiction writer and futurist Isaac Asimov, in a 1973 article "Sex in a Spaceship", conjectured what sex would be like in the weightless environment of space, anticipating some of the benefits of engaging in sex in an environment of microgravity.

On July 23, 2006, a Sex in Space panel was held at the Space Frontier Foundation's annual conference. Speakers were science journalist-author Laura Woodmansee, who presented her book Sex in Space; Jim Logan, the first graduate of a new aerospace medicine residency program to be hired by NASA's Johnson Space Center in Houston; and Vanna Bonta, an American poet, novelist, and actress who had recently flown in zero gravity and had agreed to an interview for Woodmansee's book. The speakers made presentations that explored "the biological, emotional, and ... physical issues that will confront people moving [off Earth] into the space environment." NBC science journalist Alan Boyle reported on the panel, opening a world discussion of a topic previously considered taboo.

"Sex in Space" was the title of an episode of the History Channel documentary television series The Universe in 2008. The globally distributed show was dubbed into foreign languages, opening worldwide discussion about what had previously been avoided as a taboo subject. Sex in space became a topic of discussion for the long-term survival of the human species, colonization of other planets, inspired songs, and humanized reasons for space exploration.

Wire-based special effects in Moonraker (1979)

The idea of sex in space appears frequently in science fiction. Arthur C. Clarke claimed to first address it in his 1973 novel Rendezvous with Rama.

In the pilot episode of The Expanse, 'Dulcinea', a scene was shown where the first officer of the ice hauler ship, the Canterbury, was having sexual intercourse with the ship's navigator in zero gravity. The intercourse was met with a sudden interruption when the ship resumed thrust, slamming them both to the bunk bed with the acceleration.

On February 24, 2026, The Daily Show aired a segment featuring space sexology researchers Maria Santaguida and Simon Dubé discussing their research on sex in space. During the segment, they presented a replica of Vanna Bonta’s 2Suit, a garment designed to facilitate intimacy in weightless environments, which Santaguida recreated for the show. Correspondent Michael Kosta tested the garment under simulated spaceflight conditions, using an inflatable doll referred to as “Judy” as part of the demonstration.

== See also ==
- Birth aboard aircraft and ships
- Document 12-571-3570 – Fictional NASA document
- Effect of spaceflight on the human body – Medical issues associated with spaceflight
- Mile high club – People who have had sex during an aircraft flight
- Space advocacy – Advocacy for exploration and/or colonization of space
- Space colonization – Concept of permanent human habitation outside of Earth
- Space medicine – Application of medicine during spaceflight
- Space sexology – Scientific study of extraterrestrial intimacy and sexuality
- Space tourism – Human space travel for recreation
