= Judith Lapierre =

Judith Lapierre is a Quebec-born professor of nursing at the Université Laval. She studied at the International Space University in France. She is trained in psychology and sociology and is a health promotions specialist.

LaPierre was selected for the mission aboard the International Space Station (SFINCCS) in 1999. She later accused two Russian cosmonauts of sexual harassment after a 110-day simulation of space station living. Among the claims were an unwarranted kiss during a New Year's Celebration; project coordinator Valery Gushin later claimed that her "refusing to be kissed" had been a leading cause for the experiment's failure. Mary Roach documents the incident in her work Packing for Mars amongst other summaries of the stress of confined environments amongst astronauts.
