= Exobiology Radiation Assembly =

ESA Earth satellite experiment (1992–93)

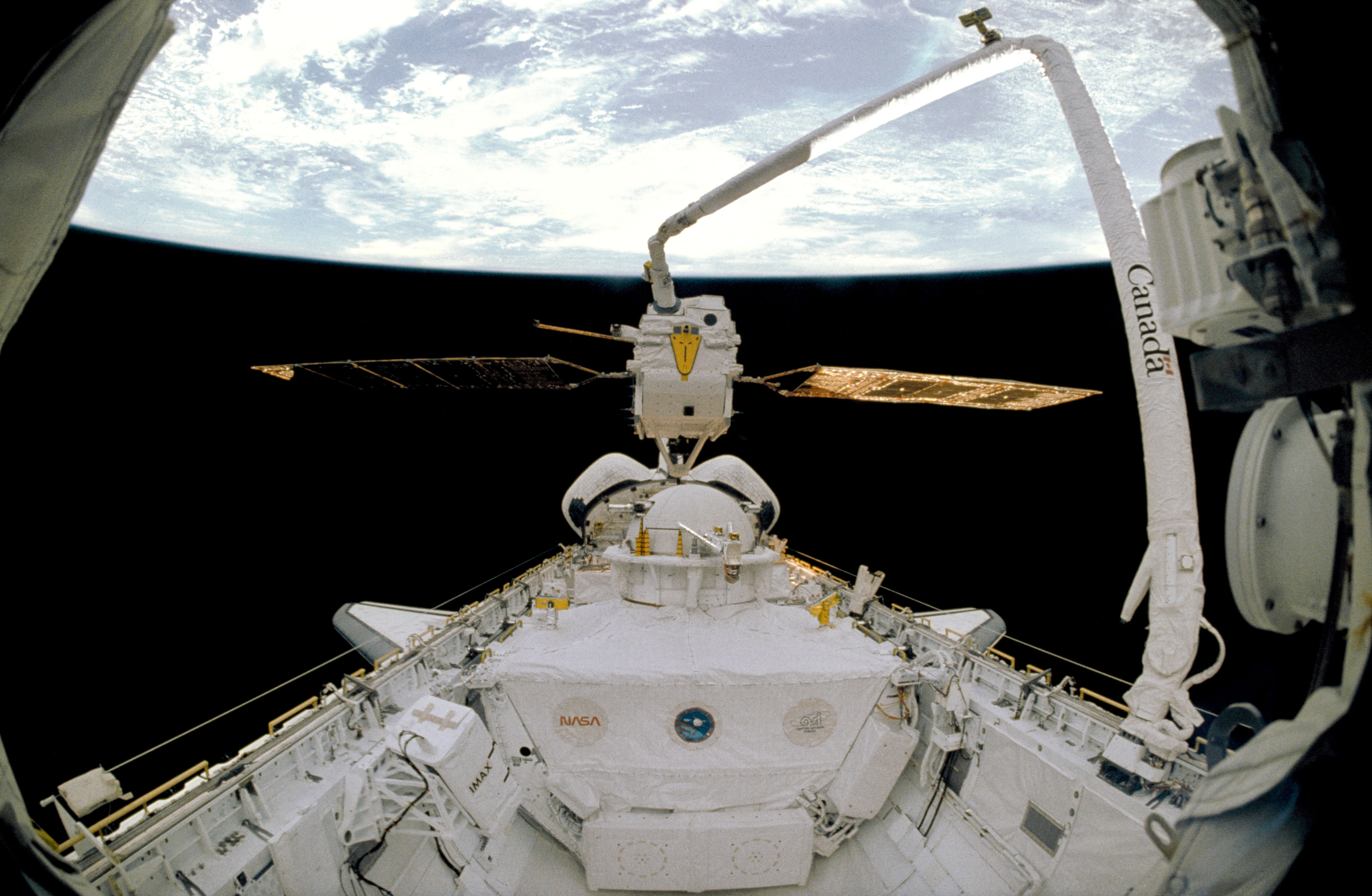
EURECA facility deployment in 1992

Exobiology Radiation Assembly (ERA) was an experiment that investigated the biological effects of space radiation. An astrobiology mission developed by the European Space Agency (ESA), it took place aboard the European Retrievable Carrier (EURECA), an unmanned 4.5 tonne satellite with a payload of 15 experiments.

It was launched 31 July 1992 by the STS-46 - Space Shuttle Atlantis and put into orbit at an altitude of 508 km. It was retrieved on 1 July 1993 by STS-57- Space Shuttle Endeavour and returned to Earth for further analysis.

== Objectives ==
The experiment's goal was to study the response of dehydrated and metabolically dormant microorganisms (spores of Bacillus subtilis, cells of Deinococcus radiodurans, conidial spores of Aspergillus species) and cellular constituents (plasmid DNA, proteins, purple membranes, amino acids, urea) to the extremely dehydrating conditions of outer space, in some cases in combination with irradiation by solar UV light.

== Results ==
ERA provided information on the long-exposure of invertebrates, microorganisms and organic molecules to outer space conditions, such as ultraviolet (UV) radiation, cosmic radiation and vacuum.

Spores of different strains of Bacillus subtilis and the Escherichia coli plasmid pUC19 were exposed to selected conditions of space (space vacuum and/or defined wavebands and intensities of solar ultraviolet radiation). After the approximately 11-month mission, the organisms' responses were studied in terms of survival, mutagenesis in the his (B. subtilis) or lac locus (pUC19), induction of DNA strand breaks, efficiency of DNA repair systems, and the role of external protective agents. The data were compared with those of a simultaneously running ground control experiment.

- When spores were exposed to the vacuum of space, but shielded from solar radiation, their survivability was substantially increased if they were exposed in multilayers and/or in the presence of glucose.
- Spores embedded in artificial meteorites (clays and simulated Martian soil) did not survive.
- Vacuum treatment lead to an increase of mutation frequency in spores, but not in plasmid DNA.
- Extraterrestrial solar ultraviolet radiation was mutagenic, inducing strand breakage in the DNA and substantially reducing survival.
- Spectroscopy confirmed the results of previous space experiments of a synergistic action of space vacuum and solar UV radiation with DNA being the critical target.
- The decrease in the microorganisms' viability could be correlated with the increase in DNA damage.
- The purple membranes, amino acids and urea were not measurably affected by the dehydrating condition of open space, if sheltered from solar radiation. Plasmid DNA, however, showed a significant amount of strand breakage.

== See also ==
- Bion
- BIOPAN
- Biosatellite program
- EXPOSE
- List of microorganisms tested in outer space
- O/OREOS
- OREOcube
- Tanpopo
