= Marsha Ivins =

American astronaut (born 1951)

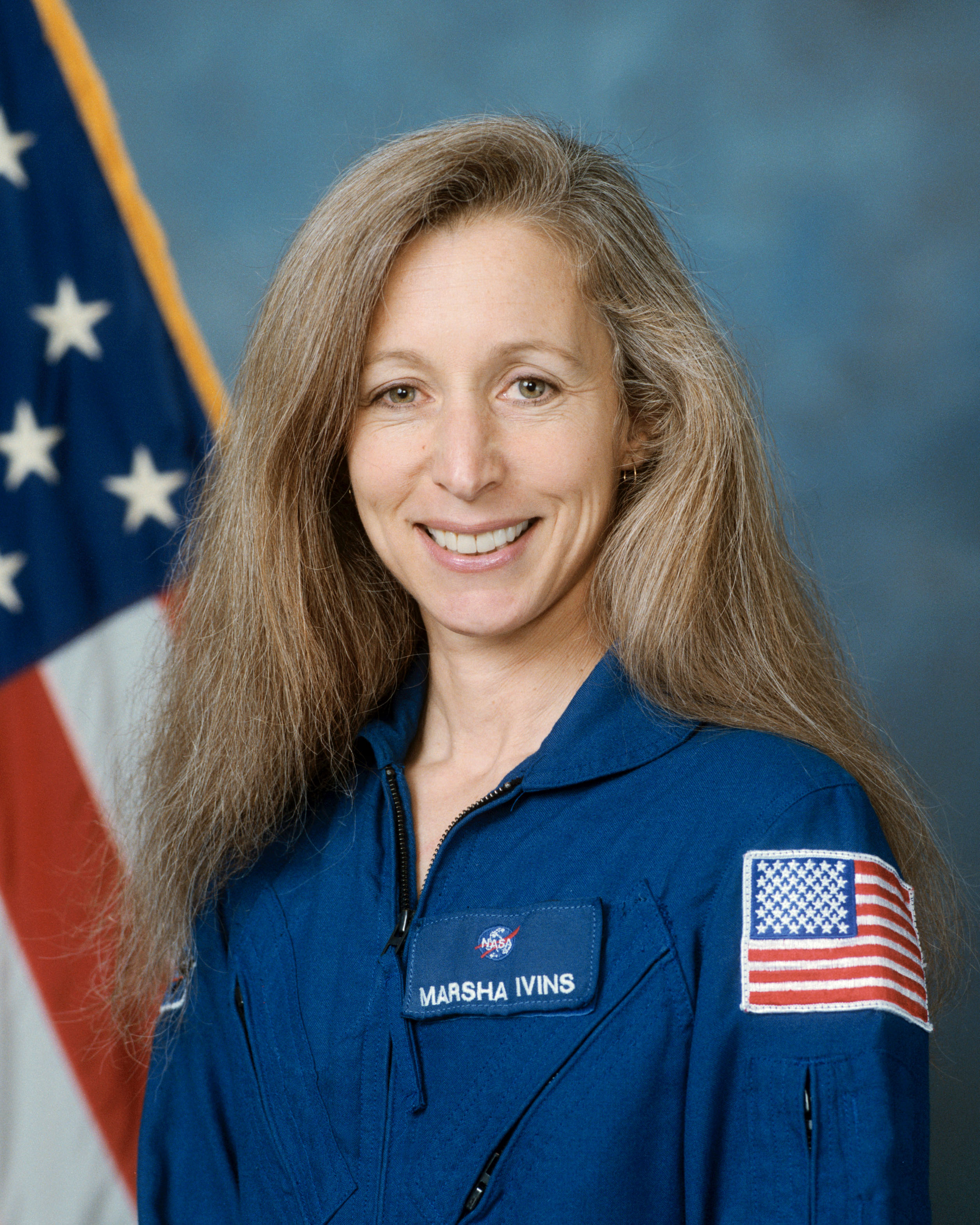
- Ivins in 1996
- Born: Marsha Sue Ivins; April 15, 1951 (age 75); Baltimore, Maryland, U.S.
- Education: University of Colorado Boulder (BS)
- Space career

NASA astronaut
- Time in space: 55d 21h 48m
- Selection: NASA Group 10 (1984)
- Missions: STS-32; STS-46; STS-62; STS-81; STS-98
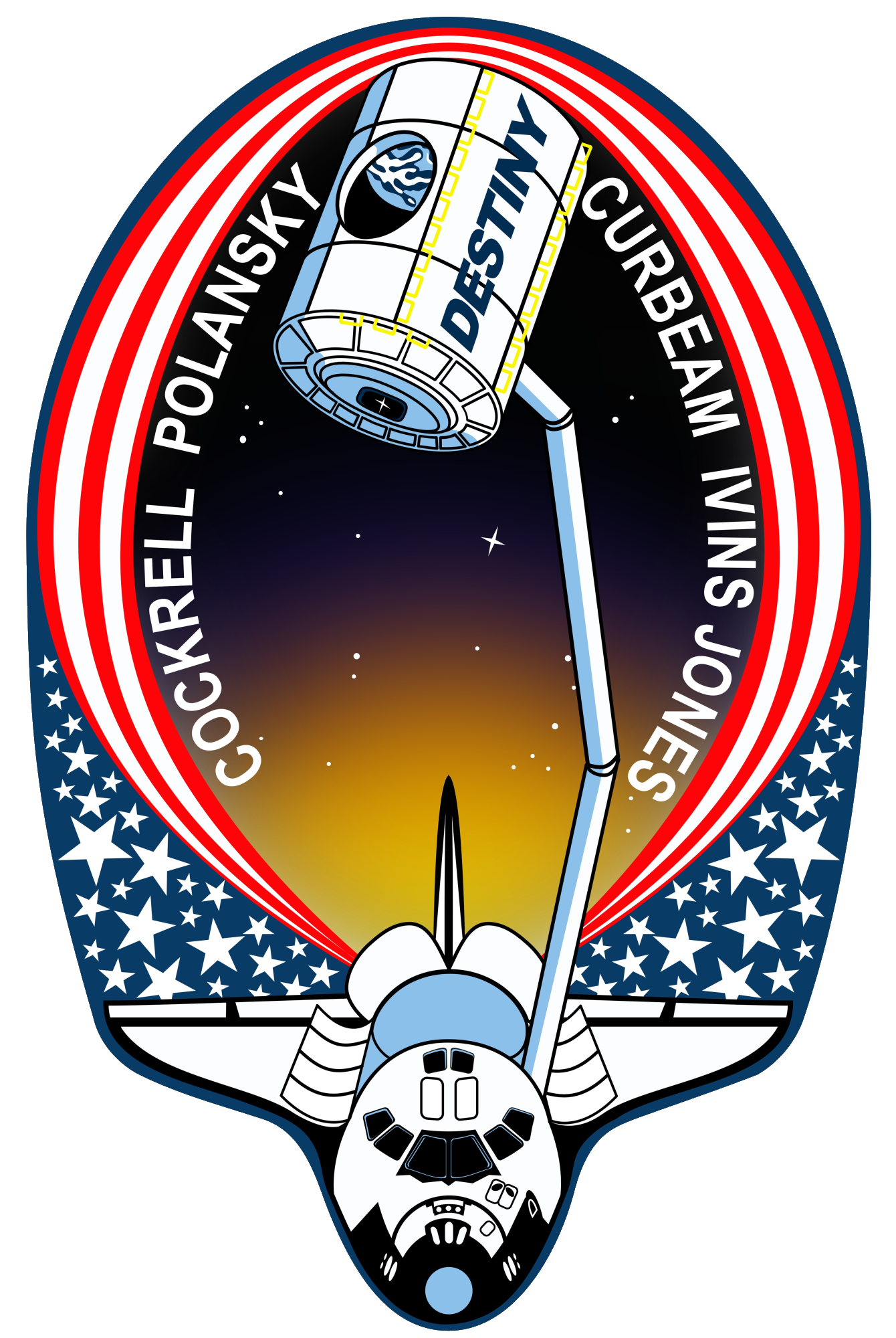
- Mission insignia

Marsha Sue Ivins (born April 15, 1951) is an American retired astronaut and a veteran of five Space Shuttle missions.

== Career ==
Born on April 15, 1951 in Baltimore, Maryland, Ivins graduated from Nether Providence High School in Wallingford, Pennsylvania in 1969, and earned a Bachelor of Science degree in aerospace engineering from the University of Colorado Boulder in 1973. She is Jewish-American. She went to work for NASA's Johnson Space Center, and worked mainly on orbiter displays and controls, before being assigned as a flight engineer in 1980 and co-pilot on NASA administrative aircraft. In 1984, Ivins was selected as an astronaut candidate.

She has flown aboard five space missions: STS-32 (1990), STS-46 (1992), STS-62 (1994), STS-81 (1997), and STS-98 (2001). Ivins retired from NASA on December 31, 2010.

== Spaceflight experience ==
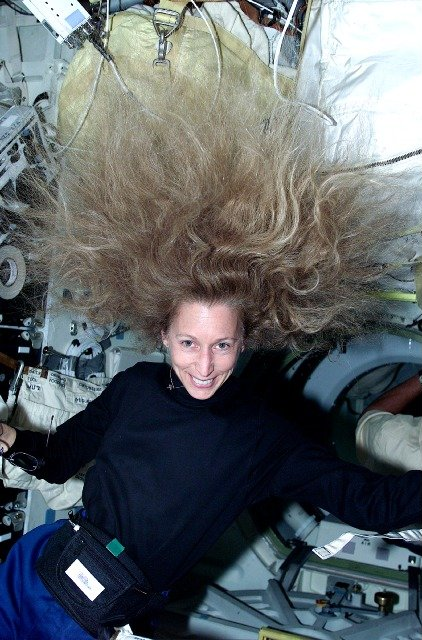
Marsha Ivins experiencing weightlessness during STS-98

STS-32 (January 9–20, 1990) launched from the Kennedy Space Center, Florida, on an eleven-day flight, during which crew members on board the Space Shuttle Columbia successfully deployed a Syncom satellite, and retrieved the 21,400-pound Long Duration Exposure Facility (LDEF). Mission duration was 261 hours, 1 minute, and 38 seconds. Following 173 orbits of the Earth and 4.5 million miles, Columbia returned with a night landing at Edwards Air Force Base, California.

STS-46 (July 31 – August 8, 1992) was an 8-day mission, during which crew members deployed the EURECA (European Retrievable Carrier) satellite, and conducted the first Tethered Satellite System (TSS) test flight. Mission duration was 191 hours, 16 minutes, and 7 seconds. Space Shuttle Atlantis and her crew launched and landed at the Kennedy Space Center, Florida, completing 126 orbits of the Earth in 3.35 million miles.

STS-62 (March 4–18, 1994) was a 14-day mission for the United States Microgravity Payload (USMP) 2 and Office of Aeronautics and Space Technology (OAST) 2 payloads. These payloads studied the effects of microgravity on materials sciences and other space flight technologies. Other experiments on board included demonstration of advanced teleoperator tasks using the remote manipulator system, protein crystal growth, and dynamic behavior of space structures. Mission duration was 312 hours, 23 minutes, and 16 seconds. Space Shuttle Columbia launched and landed at the Kennedy Space Center, Florida, completing 224 orbits in 5.82 million miles.

STS-81 Atlantis (January 12–22, 1997) was a 10-day mission, the fifth to dock with Russia's Space Station Mir, and the second to exchange U.S. astronauts. The mission also carried the Spacehab double module providing additional middeck locker space for secondary experiments. In five days of docked operations more than three tons of food, water, experiment equipment and samples were moved back and forth between the two spacecraft. Following 160 orbits of the Earth, the STS-81 mission concluded with a landing on Kennedy Space Center's Runway 33 ending a 3.9 million mile journey. Mission duration was 244 hours, 56 minutes.

STS-98 Atlantis (February 7–20, 2001) continued the task of building and enhancing the International Space Station by delivering the U.S. laboratory module Destiny. The Shuttle spent seven days docked to the station while Destiny was attached and three spacewalks were conducted to complete its assembly. The crew also relocated a docking port, and delivered supplies and equipment to the resident Expedition-1 crew. Space Shuttle Atlantis returned to land at Edwards Air Force Base, California traveling 5.3 million miles in 203 orbits. Mission duration was 12 days, 21 hours, 20 minutes.

== Interviews ==
- Interview with Marsha Ivins at Puskas Tivadar Telecommunicational Technical School on YouTube, Budapest, December 6, 2012.
- What It's Like to Spend 55 Days in Space, By Chris Mooney in Mother Jones, September 20, 2013, accessed May 7, 2014
- An Astronaut Reveals What Life In Space Is Really Like, By Marsha Ivins as told to Caitlin Roper in Wired Magazine, November 19, 2014, accessed November 23, 2014
