= Franco Malerba =

Italian astronaut and politician (born 1946)

Franco Egidio Malerba
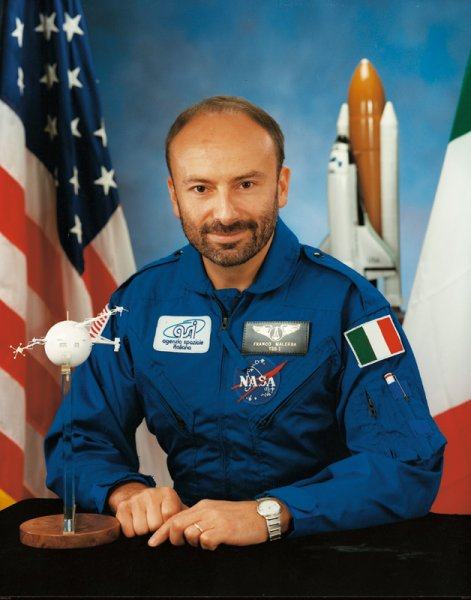

Member of the European Parliament
- In office 19 July 1994 – 19 July 1999

Personal details
- Born: 10 October 1946 (age 79) Busalla, Metropolitan City of Genoa, Liguria, Italy
- Party: Forza Italia
- Education: University of Genoa, Doctor in Physics (1974); Yale University, Ph.D. in Economics
- Scientific career
- Awards: Schumpeter Prize
- Space career

ASI astronaut
- Status: Retired
- Time in space: 7d 23h 15m
- Selection: 1989 ASI Group
- Missions: STS-46
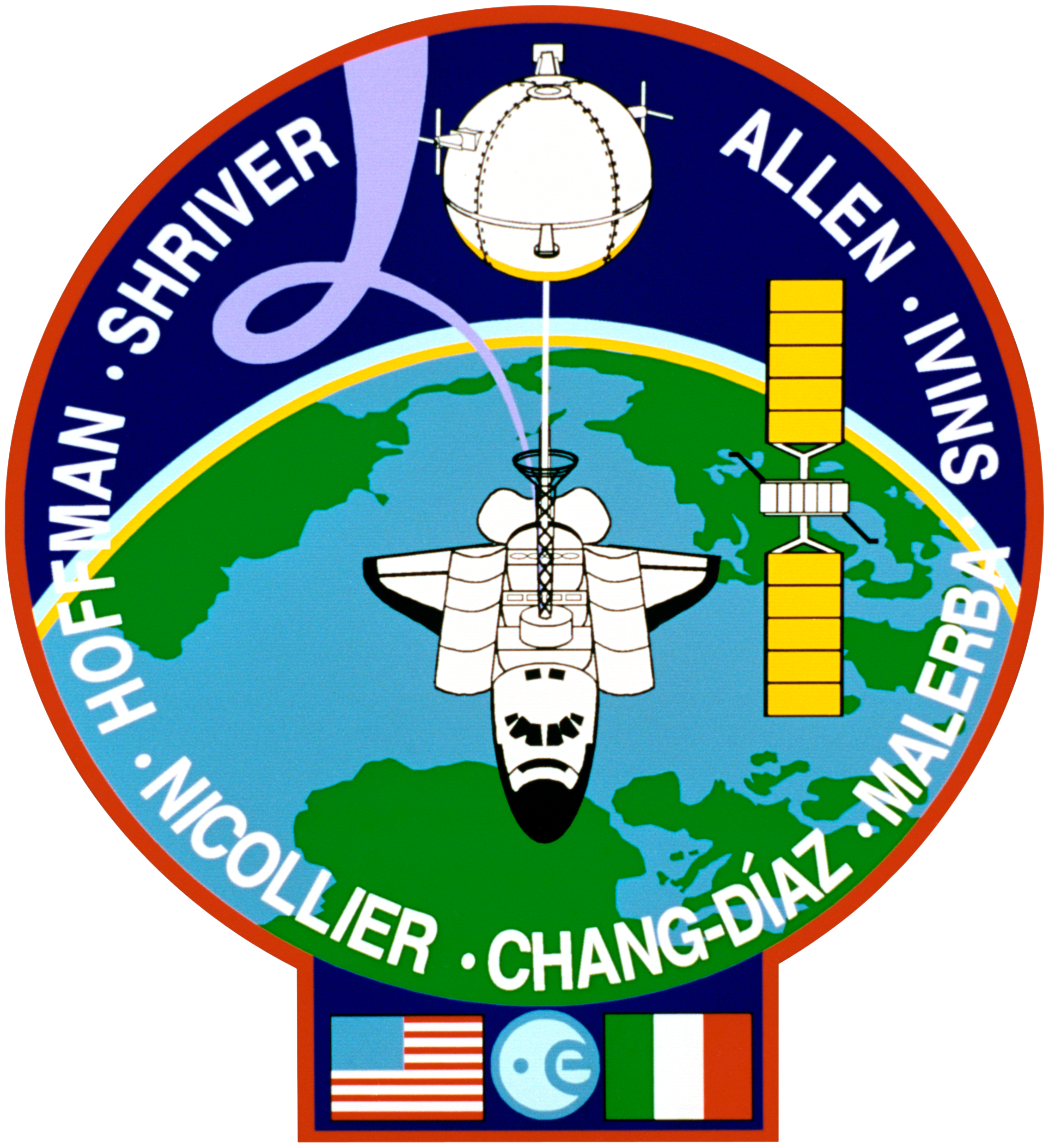
- Mission insignia

Franco Egidio Malerba (born 10 October 1946 in Busalla, Metropolitan City of Genoa, Italy) is an Italian astronaut and Member of the European Parliament. In 1992 he was the first citizen of Italy to travel to space. In 1994, he was elected to the European Parliament on the lists of Forza Italia, serving until 1999.

== Education ==
- 1965 Maturità classica (Lyceum).
- 1970 University degree, Electronics Engineer, University of Genoa, Italy, specializing in the telecommunications field (laurea 110/110 cum Laude).
- 1974 Doctor in Physics, University of Genoa, (110/110) specializing in Biophysics (after research work at the Italian National Research Council (CNR) and at the National Institutes of Health, Bethesda, Maryland, USA).

== Organizations ==
Founding Member of the Italian Space Society.

== Research activities ==
- 1970-75 Research Assistant at CNR's Laboratorio de Biofisica e Cibernetica (Genoa) carrying experimental work on membrane biophysics (using squid axons) and biological membrane modeling with lipid bilayers.
- 1971 Lecturer of Cybernetics and Information Theory at the Physics Faculty, University of Genoa.
- 1972 Summer Research Assistant at the Nato Saclant Research Center (La Spezia, Italy) working on computer-aided signal detection methodologies for sonar data systems.
- 1972-74 Research Fellow at the National Institutes of Health (Bethesda, Maryland) designing, developing, testing and using a fast micro-spectrophotometer for research on photoreceptors biophysics (using frog retinas).
- 1977-80 In 1977, Dr. Malerba was chosen by the European Space Agency (ESA) as one of four European Payload Specialist Candidates for the first Spacelab mission. After this selection he became a staff member at the European Space Research and Technology Centre (ESTEC) of ESA Space Science Department, Space Plasma Physics Division, working in the development, testing, and qualification of ES020 - PICPAB, an experiment in Ionospheric Plasma Physics for the first Spacelab payload, flown in 1983, involving the use of accelerated charged particle beams (cooperation involved French CNRS/CRPE, Norwegian NRDE and ESTEC).

== Industry experience ==
- 1976-89 Held technical and technical management positions with Digital Equipment in Italy and in Europe. He worked mainly in the field of multiprocessor systems (Paris 1976, Milan 1977), computer networks engineering (Geneva 1981-85), and telecommunications technology (Rome 1986–88, and Sophia Antipolis in 1989).

== Military experience ==
Reserve Officer, Marina Militare. Served in 1974-75 (Sottotenente Armi Navali); was assigned to the Destroyer San Giorgio as Science Lecturer to the Naval Academy, and then to the Mariperman Technical Center in La Spezia working on ELF transmission systems.

== Other skills ==
Obtained scuba diving license from the Calypso Scuba Club, Geneva (1984).

In 2021, he started startup company SpaceV to research the possibility of growing plants in space.

== Flying status ==
Obtained Private Pilot License (College Park, Washington, D.C., 1973) and then the equivalent Italian flying license.

== Spaceflight experience ==
After selection in 1989 as a Payload Specialist by the Italian Space Agency (ASI) and NASA, he became a staff member of ASI and was assigned to the NASA Johnson Space Center, Houston, Texas, for training. In September 1991, he was designated Prime Payload Specialist for the TSS-1 Space Shuttle mission. Malerba flew as the first Italian citizen in space on STS-46 (31 July 1992 to 7 August 1992). He is now involved with the ASI's crewed space flight program follow-on activities.
