= European Retrievable Carrier =

ESA space science satellite

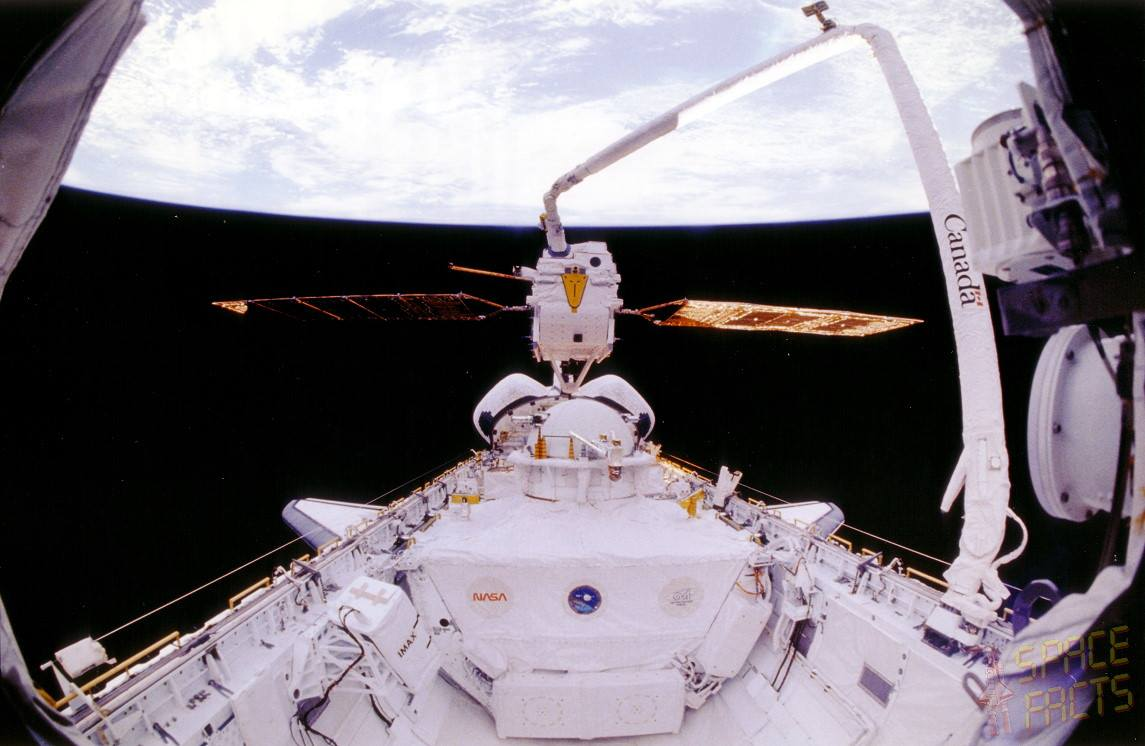
- EURECA deployment in 1992
- Mission type: Materials science Astronomy
- Operator: ESA
- COSPAR ID: 1992-049B
- SATCAT no.: 22065
- Mission duration: Planned: 1 year Elapsed: 334 days

Spacecraft properties
- Manufacturer: MBB-ERNO
- Launch mass: 4,491 kilograms (9,901 lb)
- Power: 1,000 watts

Start of mission
- Launch date: 31 July 1992, 11:56:48 UTC
- Rocket: Space Shuttle Atlantis; STS-46
- Launch site: Kennedy LC-39B
- Deployment date: 2 August 1992

End of mission
- Disposal: Recovered
- Recovered by: Space Shuttle Endeavour; STS-57
- Recovery date: 1 July 1993

Orbital parameters
- Reference system: Geocentric
- Regime: Low Earth
- Eccentricity: 0.00066
- Perigee altitude: 438 kilometres (272 mi)
- Apogee altitude: 447 kilometres (278 mi)
- Inclination: 28.5 degrees
- Period: 93.4 minutes
- Epoch: 2 August 1992, 20:00:00 UTC

The European Retrievable Carrier (EURECA) was an uncrewed 4.5-tonne satellite with 15 experiments. It was a European Space Agency (ESA) mission and the acronym was derived from Archimedes' bathtub revelation "Eureka!".

It was built by the German MBB-ERNO and had automatic material science cells as well as small telescopes for solar observation (including x-ray).

It was launched 31 July 1992 by Space Shuttle Atlantis during STS-46, and placed into an orbit at an altitude of 508 km (316 mi). EURECA was retrieved on 1 July 1993 by Space Shuttle Endeavour during STS-57 and returned to Earth. It was designed to fly five times with different experiments but the following flights were cancelled.

EURECA is one of the few uncrewed space vehicles that have been returned to the Earth unharmed. It has been on display at the Swiss Museum of Transport in Lucerne since 2000.

== Design ==
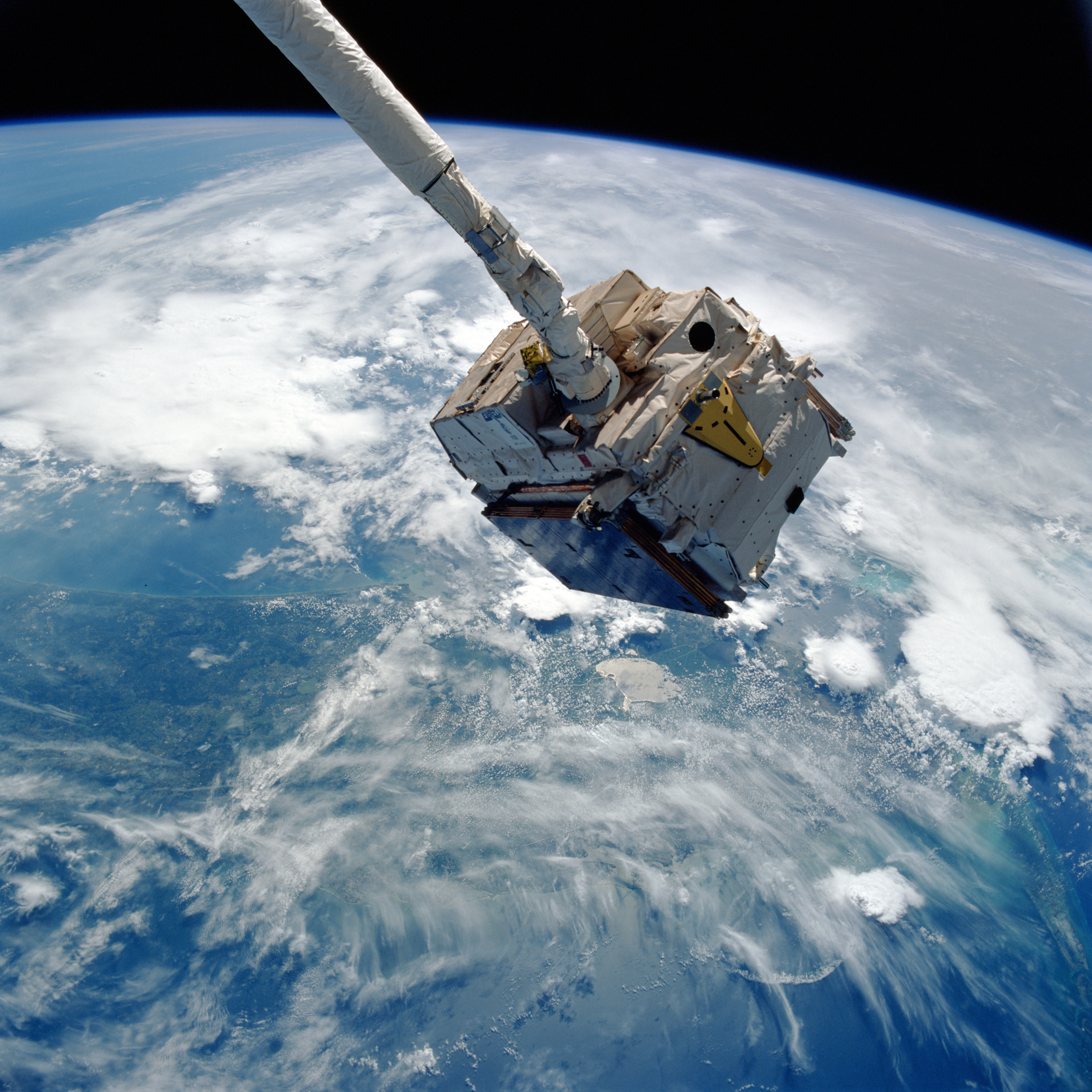
EURECA retrieval in 1993

EURECA was made of high-strength carbon-fiber struts and titanium nodal points joined together to form a framework of cubic elements. Thermal control on EURECA combined both active and passive heat transfer and radiation systems. Active heat transfer was achieved by means of a freon cooling loop which dissipated the thermal load through two radiators into space. The passive system made use of multilayer insulation blankets combined with electrical heaters.

The electrical subsystem was powered by deployable and retractable solar arrays together with four 40 amp-hour nickel-cadmium batteries. When EURECA was in the Shuttle cargo bay, power was supplied by the Shuttle. The modular attitude and orbit control subsystem (AOCS) maintained attitude and spacecraft orientation and stabilization. An orbit transfer assembly, consisting of four thrusters, was used to boost EURECA to its operational attitude of 515 km (320 mi) and return it to a retrievable orbit of about 300 km (190 mi).

EURECA was three-axis stabilized by means of a magnetic torque assembly together with a nitrogen reaction control assembly (RCA). Data handling was carried out by EURECAs data handling subsystem (DHS) supported by telemetry and command subsystems providing the link to the ground station.

== Experiments ==
EURECA consisted of 15 experiments:

- Solution Growth Facility (SGF) (Belgium, Denmark, Norway)
- Protein Crystallization Facility (PCF) (Germany)
- Exobiology Radiation Assembly (ERA) (Germany)
- Multi-Furnace Assembly (MFA) (Italy)
- Automatic Mirror Furnace (AMF) (Germany)
- Surface Forces Adhesion Instrument (SFA) (Italy)
- High Precision Thermostat Instrument (HPT) (Germany)
- Solar Constant and Variability Instrument (SOVA) (Belgium)
- Solar Spectrum Instrument (SOSP) (France)
- Occultation Radiometer Instrument (ORI) (Belgium)
- Wide Angle Telescope for Cosmic Hard X-rays (WATCH) (Denmark)
- Timeband Capture Cell Experiment (TICCE) (Great Britain) (United Kingdom)
- Radio Frequency Ionization Thruster Assembly (RITA) (Germany)
- Inter-Orbit Communications (IOC) (France/the Netherlands)
- Advanced Solar Gallium Arsenide Array (ASGA) (Italy)

The WATCH instrument observed Cosmic X-rays in an extremely wide field of view, a 65 degree range capable of observing 1/4 of the sky. The design is a Rotation Modulation Collimator, in which stripes of NaI(Tl) and CsI(Na) detectors make a phoswich.

== Results ==
WATCH monitored about 25 X-rays sources over the whole sky over the course of the mission, as well as detecting 19 cosmic gamma ray bursts. Many of the gamma ray bursts were able to be localized to within 1 degree.

In the summer of 2016, EURECA was transported to the Swiss Federal Laboratories for Materials Science and Technology (Empa) in Dübendorf near Zurich where X-ray scans of the satellite were taken. The goal was to find out how EURECA's 11-month exposure to space had affected its structure and selected experiments it carried. EURECA was then brought back to the Swiss Museum of Transport in Lucerne and has since been exhibited in a new way, with both solar panels fully deployed for the first time.

== See also ==
- Long Duration Exposure Facility – NASA 1984–1990
- Space Flyer Unit – Comparable Japanese spacecraft 1995–1996
