= STS-46 =

1992 American crewed spaceflight to deploy EURECA and TSS-1

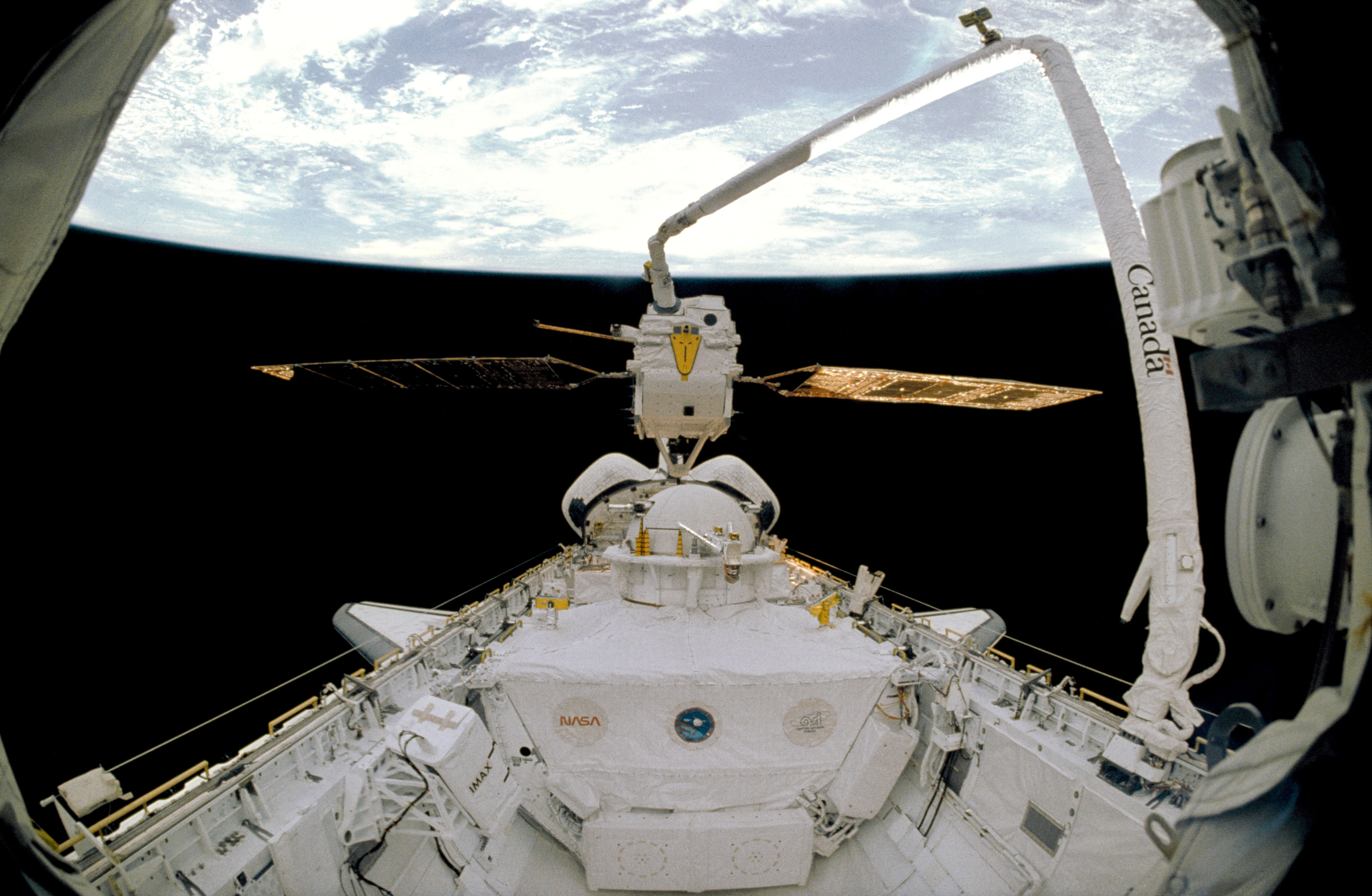
- Atlantis's Canadarm grapples the European Space Agency's EURECA satellite, prior to its deployment.
- Names: Space Transportation System-46
- Mission type: EURECA satellite deployment TSS-1 operation Technology research
- Operator: NASA
- COSPAR ID: 1992-049A
- SATCAT no.: 22064
- Mission duration: 7 days, 23 hours, 15 minutes, 2 seconds
- Distance travelled: 5,344,643 km (3,321,007 mi)
- Orbits completed: 127

Spacecraft properties
- Spacecraft: Space Shuttle Atlantis
- Launch mass: 116,134 kg (256,032 lb)
- Landing mass: 94,676 kg (208,725 lb)
- Payload mass: 12,164 kg (26,817 lb)

Crew
- Crew size: 7
- Members: Loren Shriver; Andrew M. Allen; Claude Nicollier; Marsha Ivins; Jeffrey A. Hoffman; Franklin Chang Díaz; Franco Malerba

Start of mission
- Launch date: July 31, 1992, 13:56:48 UTC (9:56:48 am EDT)
- Launch site: Kennedy, LC-39B
- Contractor: Rockwell International

End of mission
- Landing date: August 8, 1992, 13:11:50 UTC (9:11:50 am EDT)
- Landing site: Kennedy, SLF Runway 33

Orbital parameters
- Reference system: Geocentric orbit
- Regime: Low Earth orbit
- Perigee altitude: 425 km (264 mi)
- Apogee altitude: 437 km (272 mi)
- Inclination: 28.46°
- Period: 93.2 minutes

Instruments
- Consortium for Materials Development in Space Complex Autonomous Payload (CONCAP II and CONCAP III); Evaluation of Oxygen Integration with Materials/Thermal Management Processes (EOIM-III/TEMP 2A); IMAX Cargo Bay Camera (ICBC); Limited Duration Space Environment Candidate Materials Exposure (LDCE); Pituitary Growth Hormone Cell Function (PHCF); Ultraviolet Plume Instrument (UVPI)
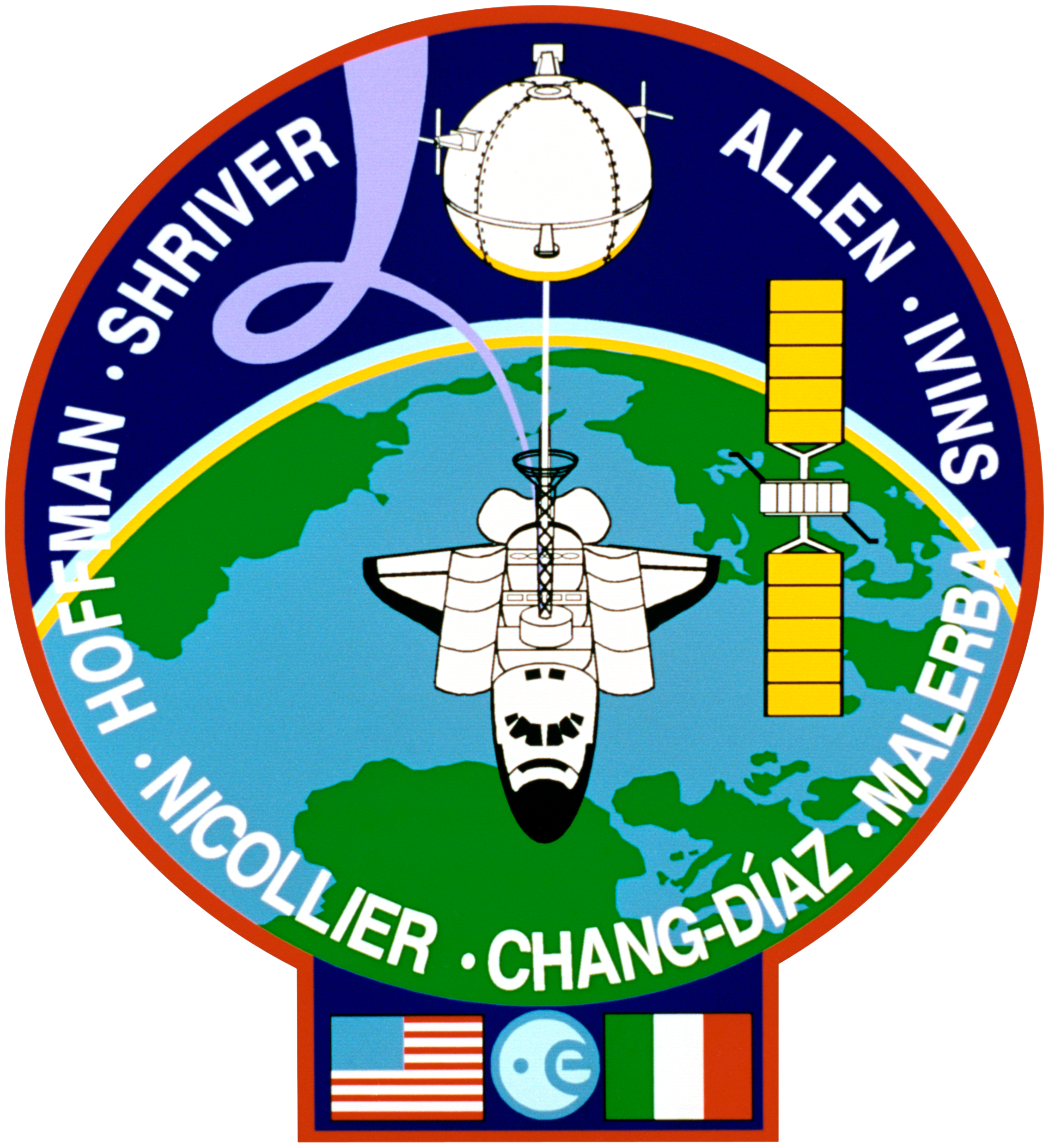
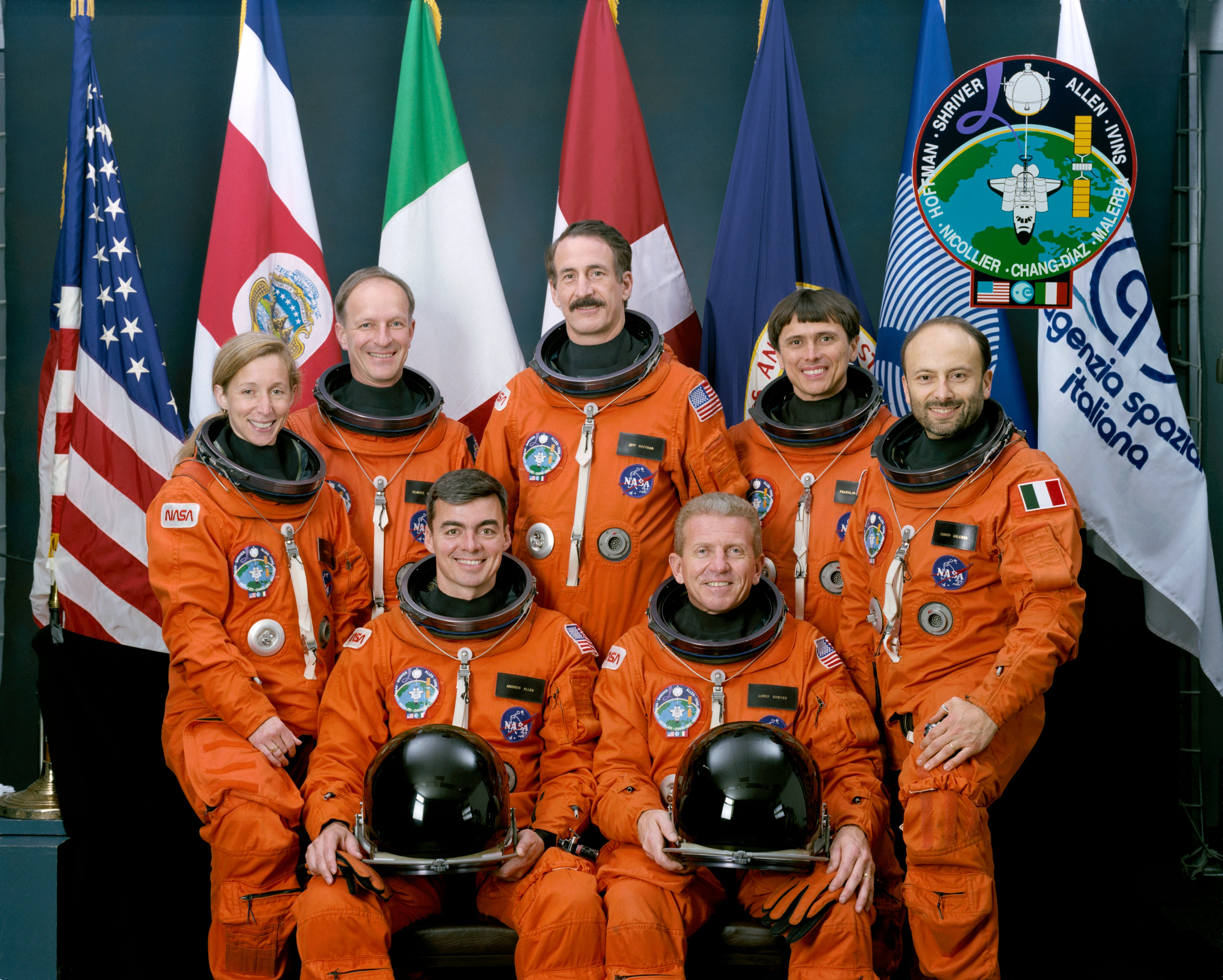
- STS-46 mission patch Standing: Ivins, Nicollier, Hoffman, Chang-Díaz and Malerba; Seated: Allen and Shriver Space Shuttle program

STS-46 was a NASA Space Shuttle mission using Atlantis and was launched on July 31, 1992, and landed on August 8, 1992.

== Crew ==
Position	Astronaut
Commander	(United States) Loren Shriver; Third and last spaceflight
Pilot	(United States) Andrew M. Allen; First spaceflight
Mission Specialist 1	(Switzerland) Claude Nicollier, ESA; First spaceflight
Mission Specialist 2 Flight Engineer	(United States) Marsha Ivins; Second spaceflight
Mission Specialist 3	(United States) Jeffrey A. Hoffman; Third spaceflight
Mission Specialist 4	(United States) / (Costa Rica) Franklin Chang-Díaz; Third spaceflight
Payload Specialist 1	(Italy) Franco Malerba, ASI; Only spaceflight
Robert L. Gibson had originally been selected to command STS-46, however, after he was involved in an air-race collision, he was suspended from training for this mission. Gibson would fly again on STS-47.

Backup crew
Position	Astronaut
Payload Specialist 1	(Italy) Umberto Guidoni, ASI

=== Crew seat assignments ===
Seat	Launch	Landing	Seats 1–4 are on the flight deck. Seats 5–7 are on the mid-deck.
1	Shriver		Seats 1–4 are on the flight deck. Seats 5–7 are on the mid-deck.
2	Allen		Seats 1–4 are on the flight deck. Seats 5–7 are on the mid-deck.
3	Nicollier	Hoffman	Seats 1–4 are on the flight deck. Seats 5–7 are on the mid-deck.
4	Ivins		Seats 1–4 are on the flight deck. Seats 5–7 are on the mid-deck.
5	Hoffman	Nicollier	Seats 1–4 are on the flight deck. Seats 5–7 are on the mid-deck.
6	Chang-Díaz		Seats 1–4 are on the flight deck. Seats 5–7 are on the mid-deck.
7	Malerba		Seats 1–4 are on the flight deck. Seats 5–7 are on the mid-deck.

== Mission highlights ==
Mission's primary objectives were the deployment of ESA's European Retrievable Carrier (EURECA) and the joint NASA/Italian Space Agency Tethered Satellite System (TSS). EURECA was deployed a day later than scheduled because of a problem with its data handling system. Seven and a half hours after deployment, the spacecraft's thrusters were fired to boost EURECA to its planned operating altitude of around 31O miles. However, thruster firing was cut to six minutes from 24 minutes because of unexpected attitude data from the spacecraft. The problem was resolved and EURECA was successfully boosted to its operational orbit on the mission's sixth day. TSS deployment also was delayed one day because of the problems with EURECA. During deployement, the satellite reached a maximum distance of only 86O feet from the orbiter instead of the planned 12.5 miles because of a jammed tether line. After numerous attempts over several days to free the tether, TSS operations were curtailed and the satellite was stowed for return to Earth. Secondary payloads included: Evaluation of Oxygen Integration with Materials/Thermal Management Processes (EOIM-III/TEMP 2A), Consortium for Materials Development in Space Complex Autonomous Payload (CONCAP II and CONCAP III), IMAX Cargo Bay Camera (ICBC), Limited Duration Space Environment Candidate Materials Exposure (LDCE), Air Force Maui Optical Site (AMOS), Pituitary Growth Hormone Cell Function (PHCF), and Ultraviolet Plume Instrument (UVPI). Mission extended extra day to complete scientific objectives.

== Gallery ==
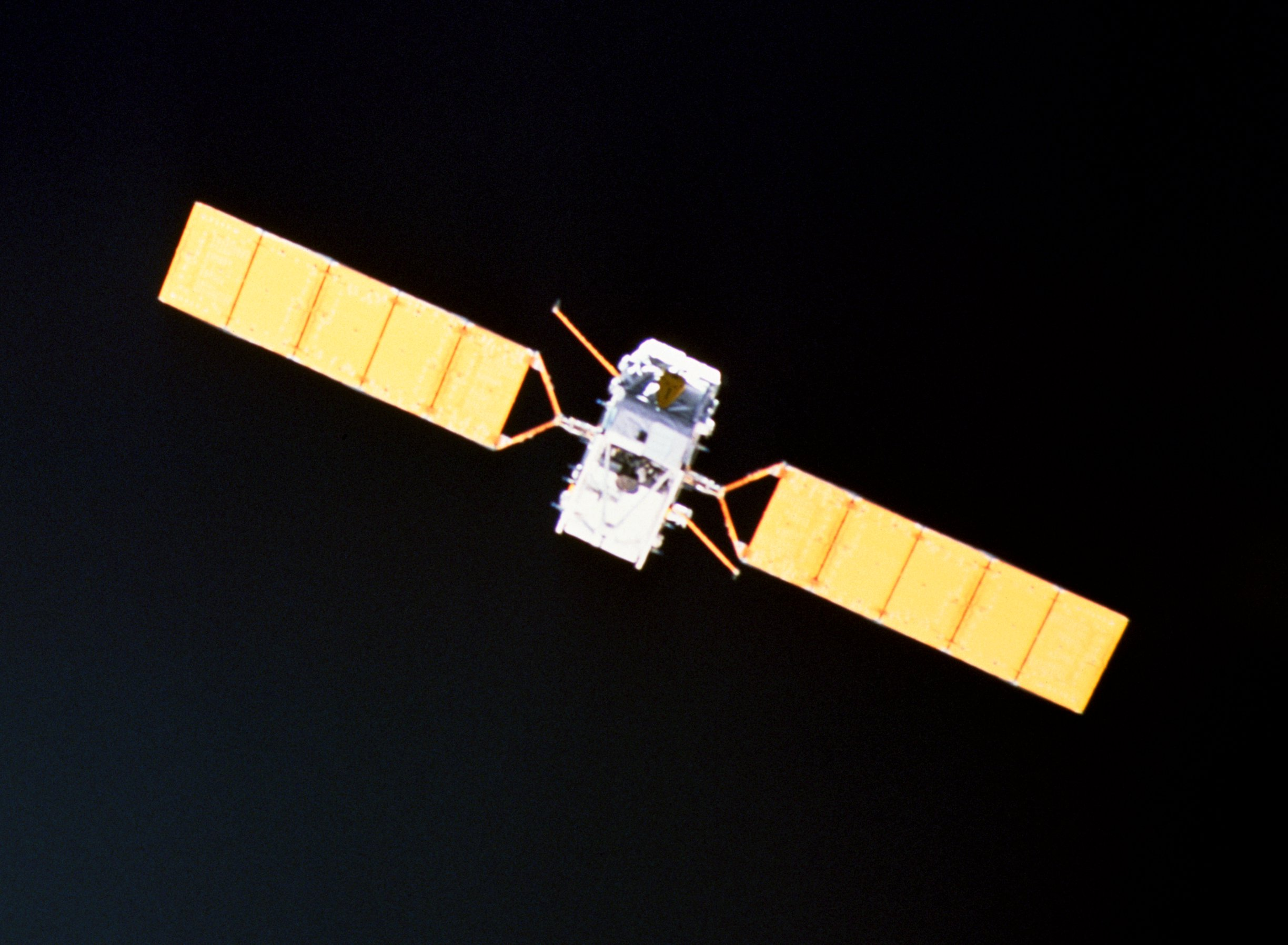
EURECA after deployment

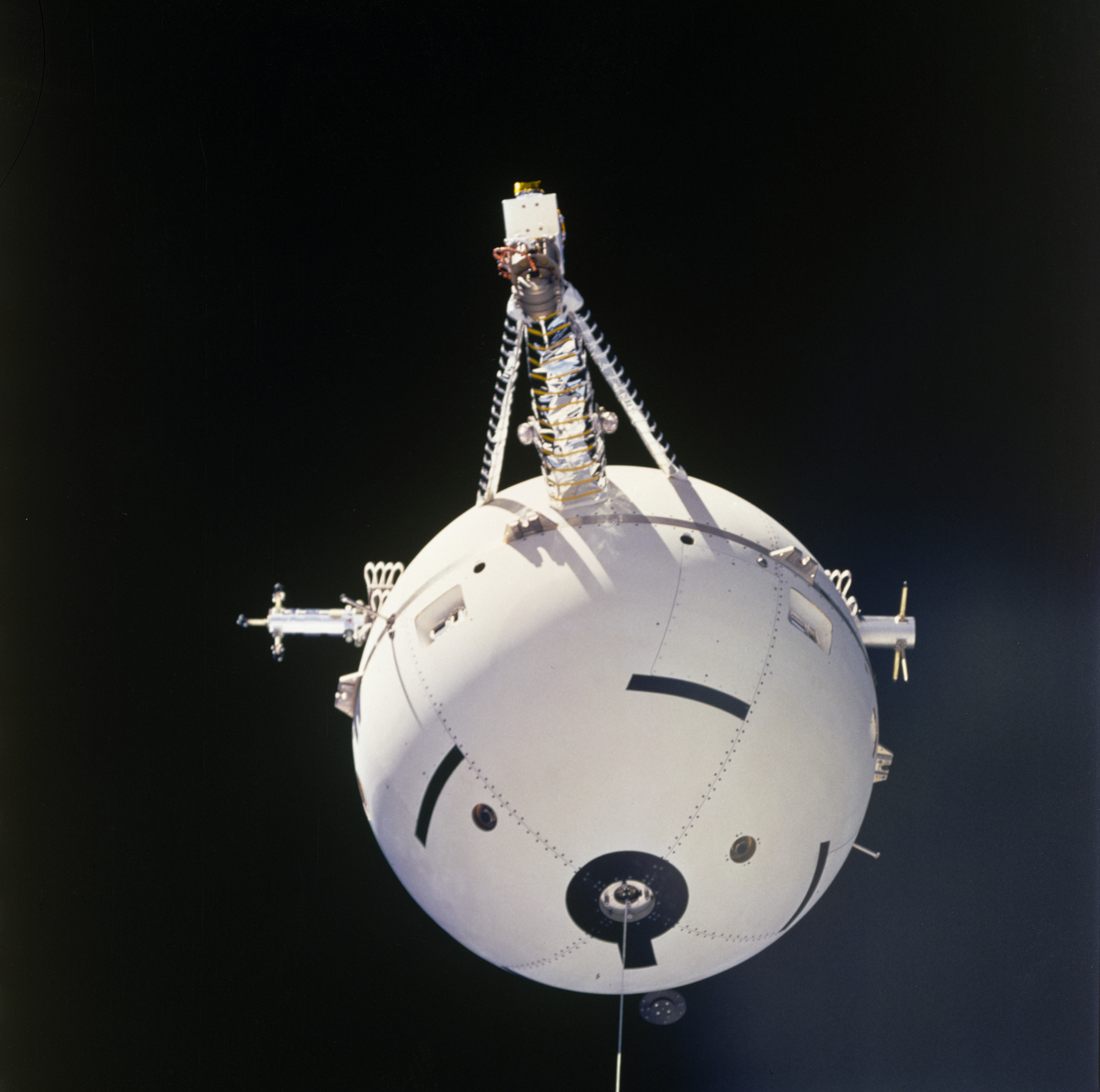
TSS-1 satellite

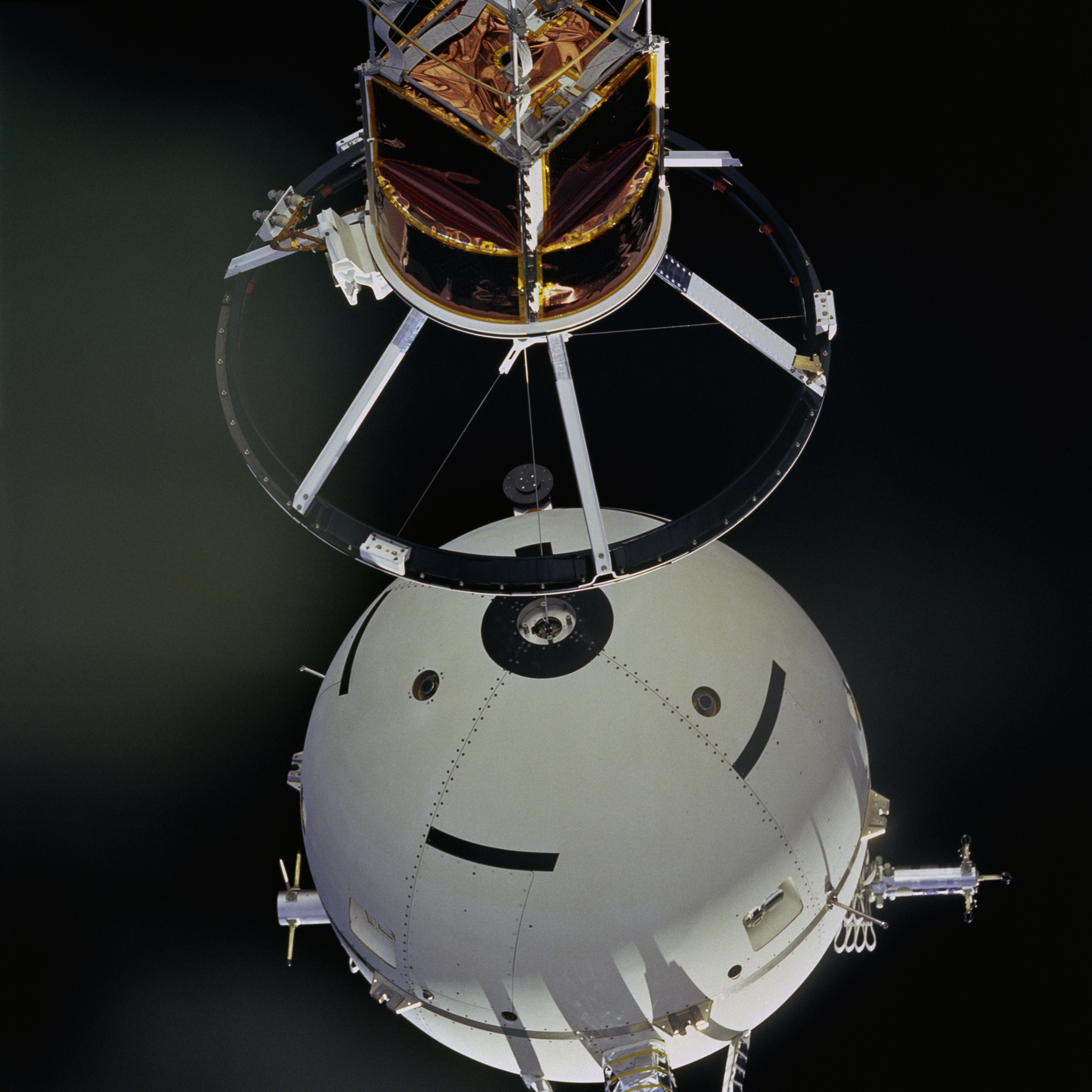
TSS-1 tether close-up deployment

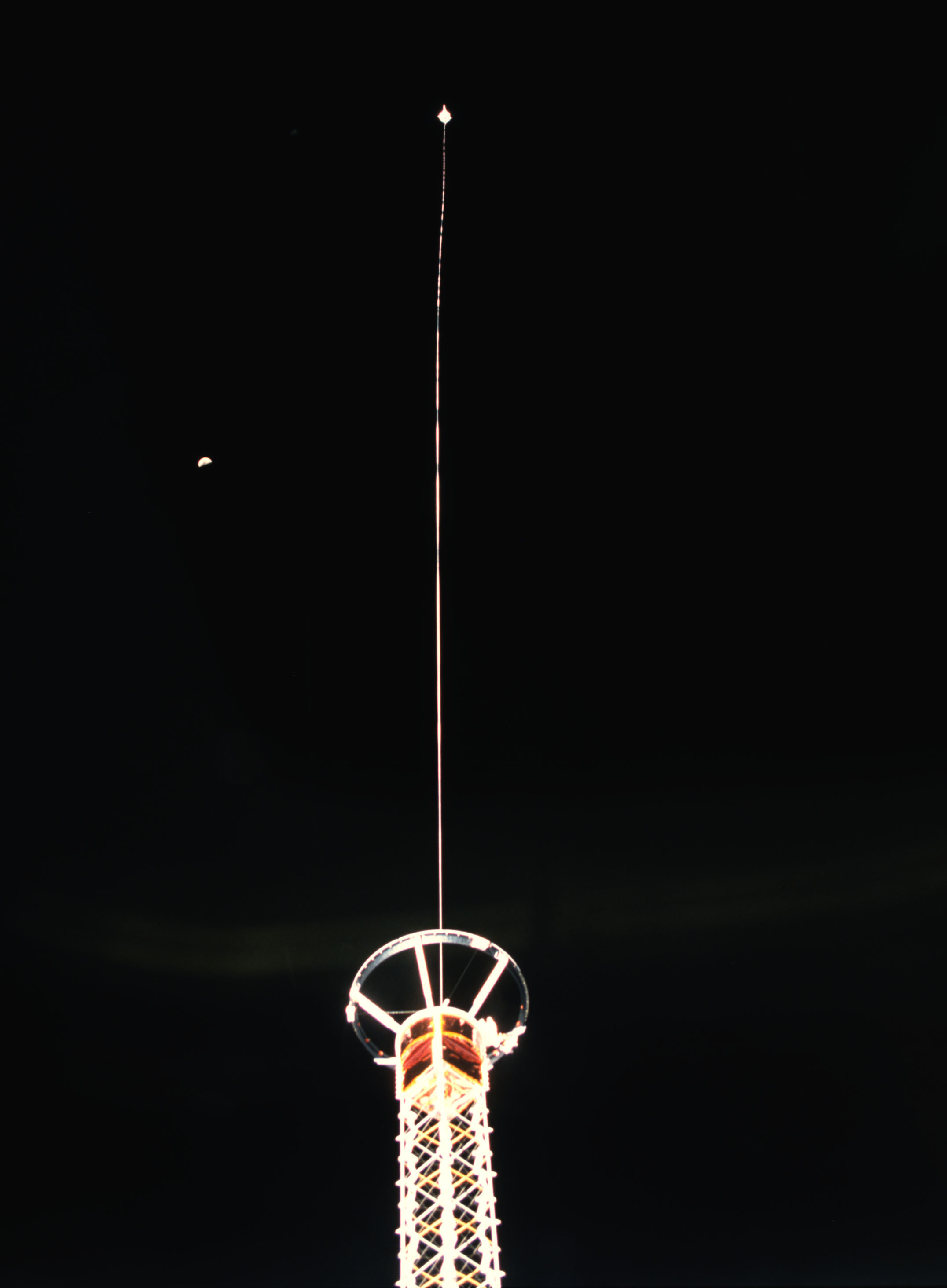
TSS-1 fully extended deployment

== See also ==
- List of human spaceflights
- List of Space Shuttle missions
- Outline of space science
- Space Shuttle
- STS-75, a space shuttle mission with objectives similar to those of STS-46
