= Space Shuttle Atlantis =

Space Shuttle orbiter (1985–2011)

Atlantis
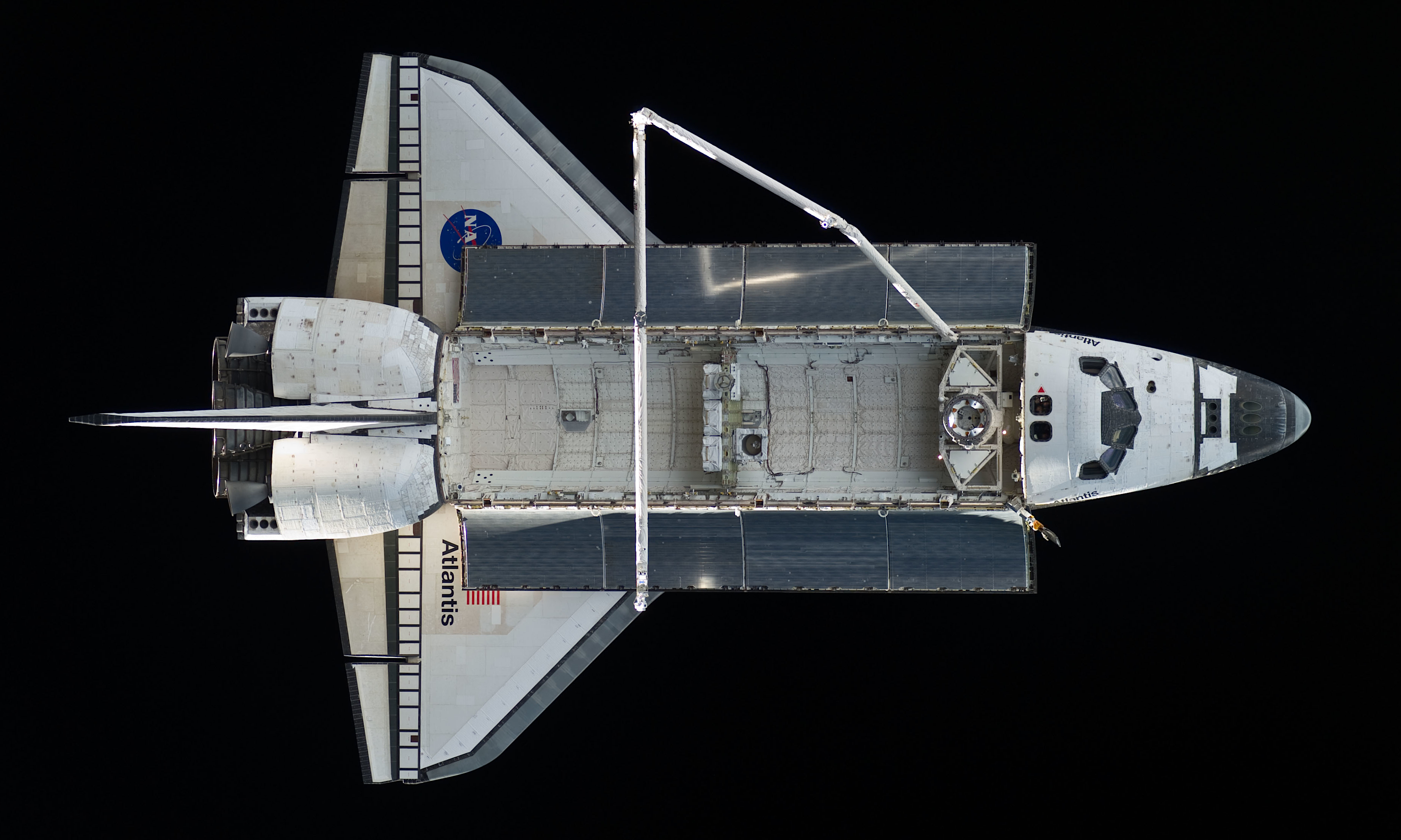
- Atlantis in orbit in 2010, during STS-132
- Type: Spaceplane
- Class: Space Shuttle orbiter
- Eponym: RV Atlantis
- Serial no.: OV-104
- Owner: NASA
- Manufacturer: Rockwell International

Specifications
- Dry mass: 78,000 kg (172,000 lb)
- Rocket: Space Shuttle

History
- First flight: October 3–7, 1985; STS-51-J
- Last flight: July 8–21, 2011; STS-135
- Flights: 33
- Flight time: 7,358 hours
- Travelled: 202,673,974 km (125,935,769 mi) around Earth
- Orbits: 4,848 around Earth
- Fate: Retired
- Location: Kennedy Space Center Visitor Complex; Merritt Island, Florida

Space Shuttle orbiters

Space Shuttle Atlantis (Orbiter Vehicle designation: OV‑104) is a retired Space Shuttle orbiter vehicle which belongs to NASA, the spaceflight and space exploration agency of the United States. Atlantis was manufactured by the Rockwell International company in Southern California and was delivered to the Kennedy Space Center in Eastern Florida in April 1985. Atlantis is the fourth operational and the second-to-last Space Shuttle built. Its maiden flight was STS-51-J made from October 3 to 7, 1985. It was, along with Challenger, one of only two orbiters equipped to carry the Shuttle-Centaur booster.

Atlantis embarked on its 33rd and final mission, and the final mission of the Space Shuttle program, STS-135, on July 8, 2011. STS-134 by Endeavour was expected to be the final flight before STS-135 was authorized in October 2010. STS-135 took advantage of the processing for the STS-335 Launch on Need mission that would have been necessary if STS-134's crew became stranded in orbit. Atlantis landed for the final time at the Kennedy Space Center on July 21, 2011.

By the end of its final mission, Atlantis had orbited the Earth a total of 4,848 times, traveling nearly 126,000,000 mi (203,000,000 km), which is more than 525 times the distance from the Earth to the Moon.

Atlantis is named after RV Atlantis, a two-masted sailing ship that operated as the primary research vessel for the Woods Hole Oceanographic Institution from 1930 to 1966.

The space shuttle is now on display at the Kennedy Space Center Visitor Complex.

== Construction milestones ==
Date	Milestone
January 29, 1979	Contract Award to Rockwell International's Space Transportation Systems Division
March 30, 1980	Start structural assembly of crew module
November 23, 1981	Start structural assembly of aft-fuselage
June 13, 1983	Wings arrive at Palmdale, California, from Grumman
December 2, 1983	Start of final assembly
April 10, 1984	Final assembly completed
March 6, 1985	Rollout from Palmdale
April 3, 1985	Overland transport from Palmdale to Edwards Air Force Base
April 13, 1985	Delivery to Kennedy Space Center.
September 12, 1985	Flight Readiness Firing
October 3, 1985	First launch (STS-51-J)

== Specifications ==
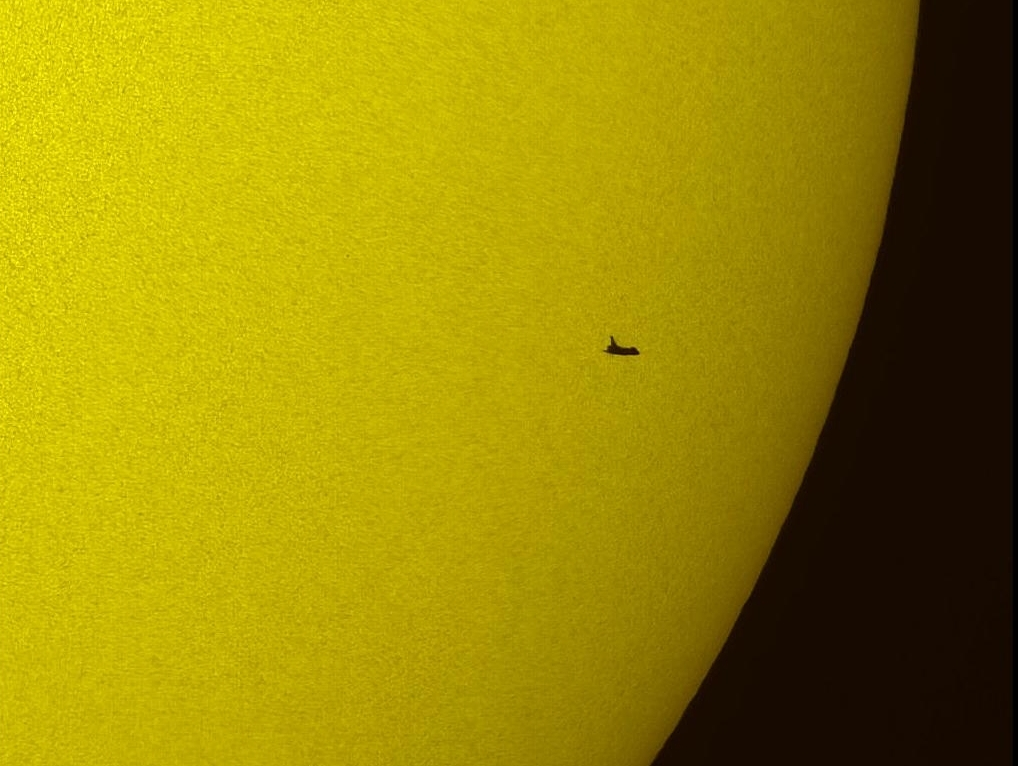
Space Shuttle Atlantis as it transits the Sun

- Weight (with three shuttle main engines): 68,635 kg (151,314 lb)
- Length: 37.2 m (122 ft)
- Height: 17.2 m (56 ft)
- Wingspan: 23.7 m (78 ft)
- Atlantis was completed in about half the time it took to build Space Shuttle Columbia.
- When it rolled out of the Palmdale assembly plant, weighing 68,635 kg (151,314 lb), Atlantis was nearly 3.5 short tons (3.2 t) lighter than Columbia.

== Missions ==
Space Shuttle Atlantis lifted off on its maiden voyage STS-51-J on October 3, 1985. This was the second shuttle mission that was a dedicated Department of Defense mission. It flew one other mission, STS-61-B (the second shuttle night launch) before the Challenger disaster temporarily grounded the shuttle fleet in 1986. Among the five Space Shuttles flown into space, Atlantis conducted a subsequent mission in the shortest time after the previous mission (turnaround time) when it launched in November 1985 on STS-61-B, only 50 days after its previous mission, STS-51-J in October 1985. Atlantis was then used for ten flights from 1988 to 1992. Two of these, both flown in 1989, deployed the planetary probes Magellan to Venus (on STS-30) and Galileo to Jupiter (on STS-34). With STS-30 Atlantis became the first Space Shuttle to launch an interplanetary probe.

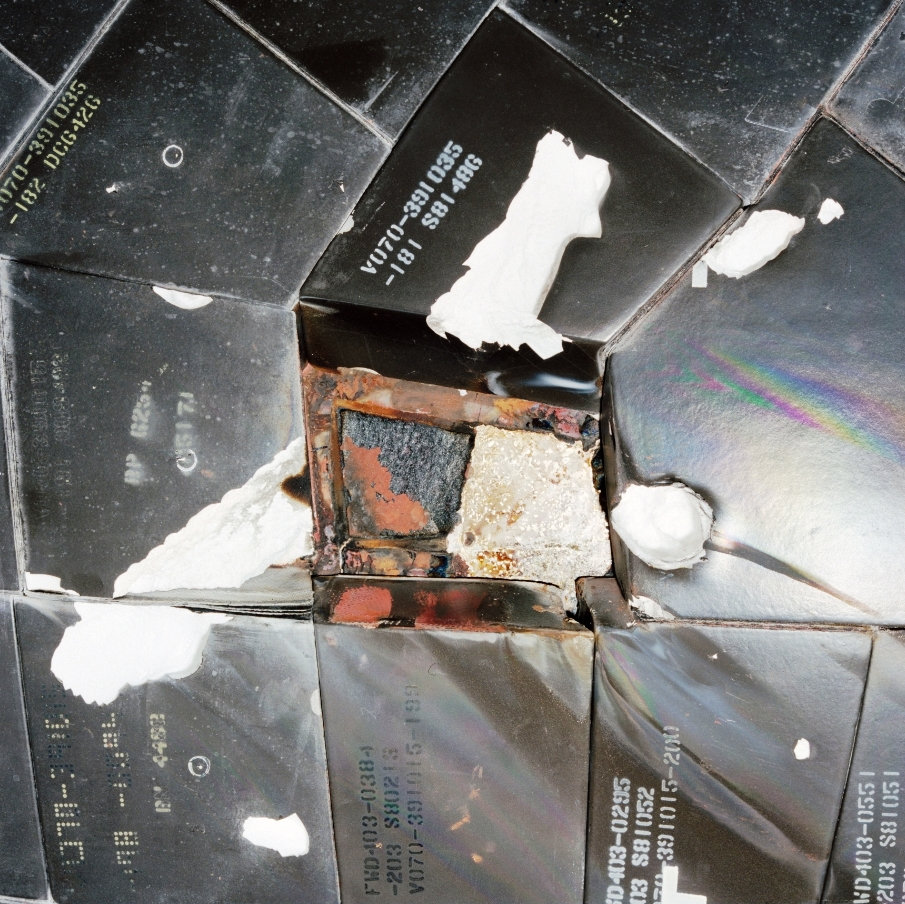
Melted aluminum plating on Atlantis's right wing underside (STS-27)

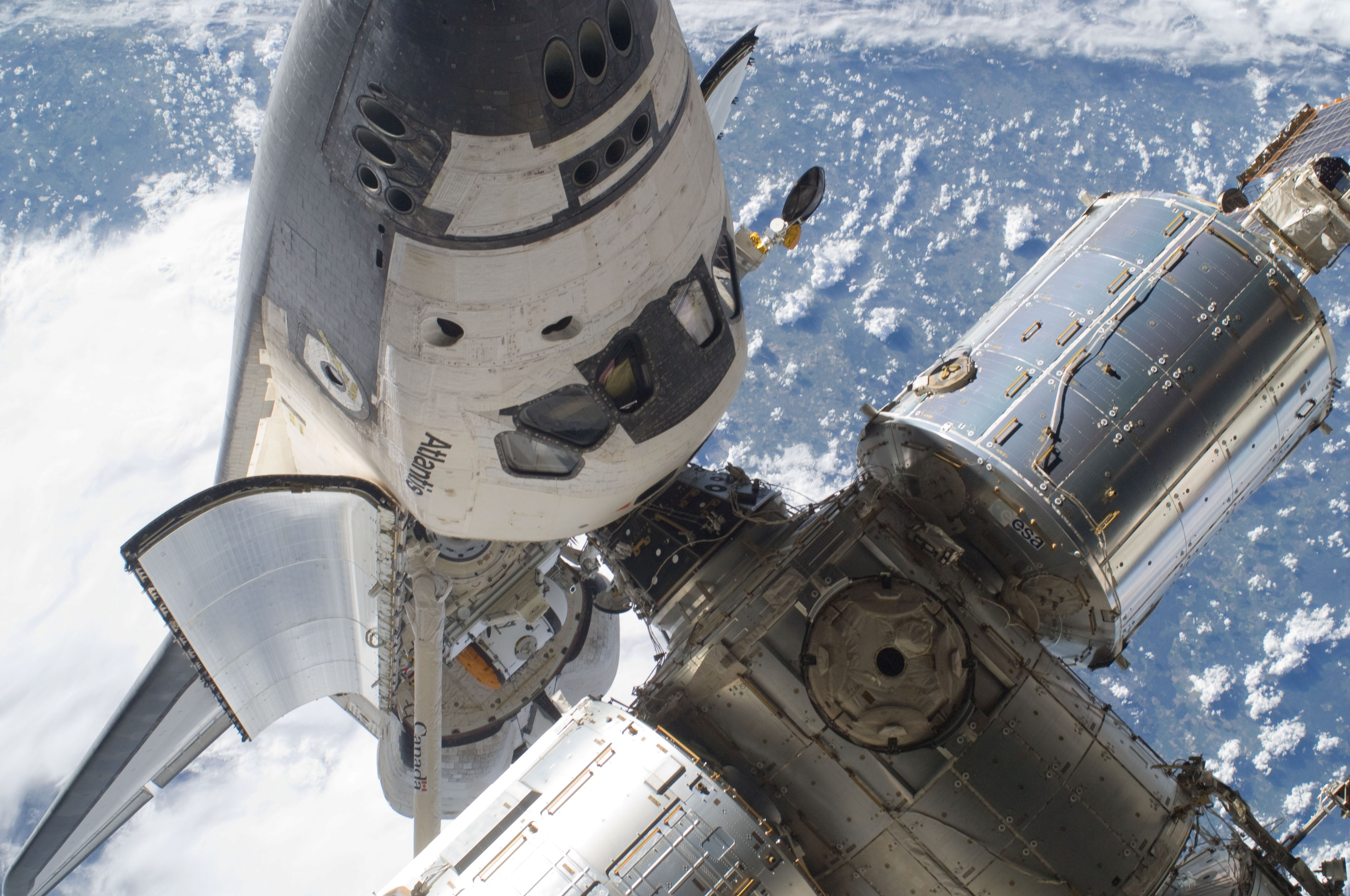
Atlantis docked to the International Space Station during STS-132 mission

During the launch of STS-27 in 1988, a piece of insulation shed from the right solid rocket booster struck the underside of the vehicle, severely damaging over 700 tiles and removing one tile altogether. The crew were instructed to use the remote manipulator system to survey the condition of the underside of the right wing, ultimately finding substantial tile damage. Due to the classified nature of the mission, the only images transferred to the mission control center were encrypted and of extremely poor quality. Mission control personnel deemed the damage to be "lights and shadows" and instructed the crew to proceed with the mission as usual, infuriating many of the crew. Upon landing, Atlantis became the single-most-damaged shuttle to successfully land. The survival of the crew is attributed to a steel L band antenna plate which was positioned directly under the missing tile. A similar situation would eventually lead to the loss of the shuttle Columbia in 2003, albeit on the more critical reinforced carbon-carbon.

During STS-37 in 1991, Atlantis deployed the Compton Gamma Ray Observatory. Beginning in 1995 with STS-71, Atlantis made seven straight flights to the former Russian space station Mir as part of the Shuttle–Mir program. STS-71 marked a number of firsts in human spaceflight: 100th U.S. crewed space flight; first U.S. Shuttle-Russian Space Station Mir docking and joint on-orbit operations; and first on-orbit change-out of shuttle crew. When linked, Atlantis and Mir together formed the largest spacecraft in orbit at the time.

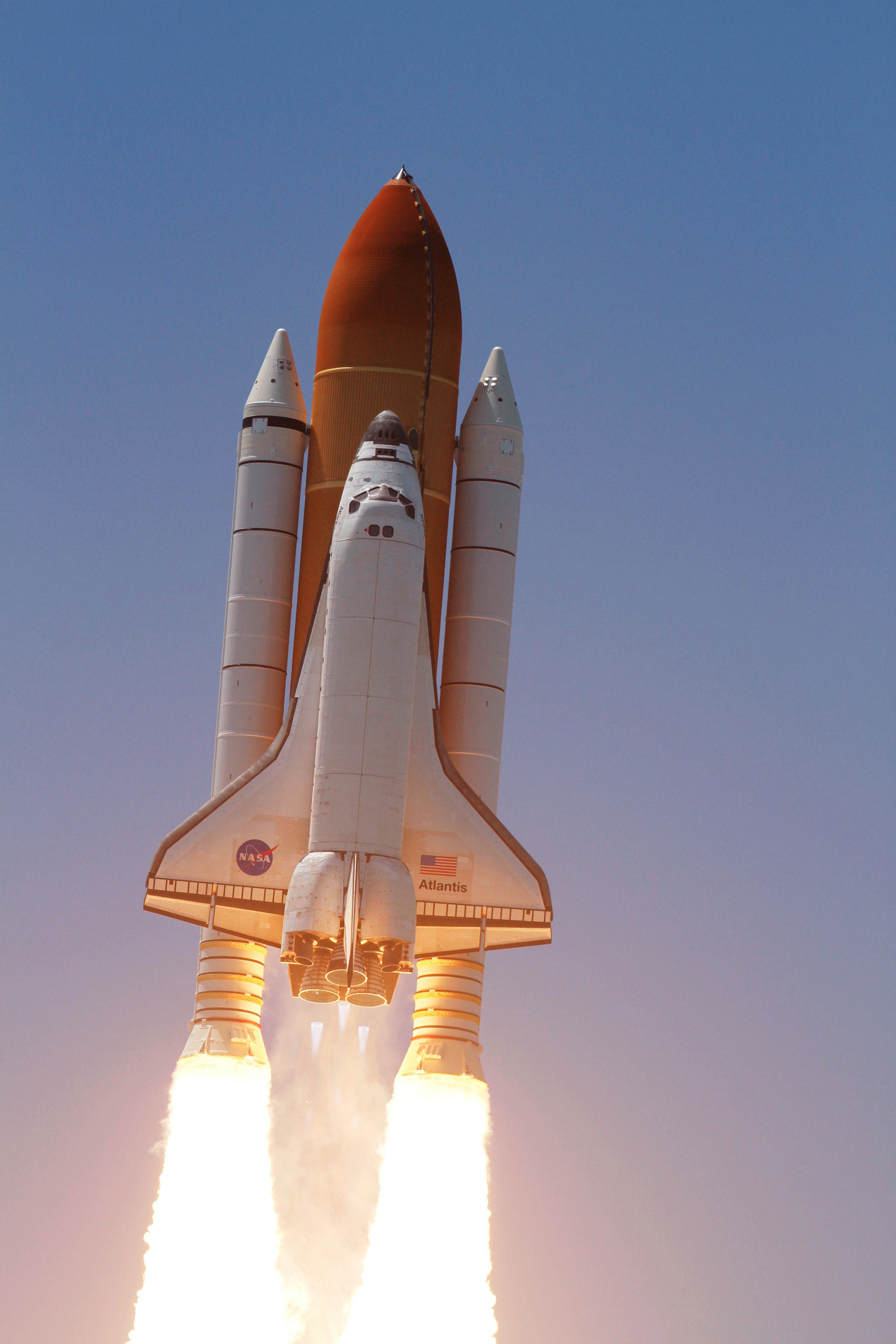
Atlantis heads toward Earth orbit at the beginning of STS-132

Atlantis delivered several vital components for the construction of the International Space Station (ISS). During the February 2001 mission STS-98 to the ISS, Atlantis delivered the Destiny Module, the primary operating facility for U.S. research payloads aboard the ISS. The 5-hour 25-minute third spacewalk performed by astronauts Robert Curbeam and Thomas Jones during STS-98 marked NASA's 100th extra vehicular activity in space. The Quest Joint Airlock, was flown and installed to the ISS by Atlantis during the mission STS-104 in July 2001. The successful installation of the airlock gave on-board space station crews the ability to stage repair and maintenance spacewalks outside the ISS using U.S. EMU or Russian Orlan space suits. The first mission flown by Atlantis after the Space Shuttle Columbia disaster was STS-115, conducted during September 2006. The mission carried the P3/P4 truss segments and solar arrays to the ISS. On ISS assembly flight STS-122 in February 2008, Atlantis delivered the Columbus laboratory to the ISS. Columbus laboratory is the largest single contribution to the ISS made by the European Space Agency (ESA).

STS-132 Space Shuttle launch

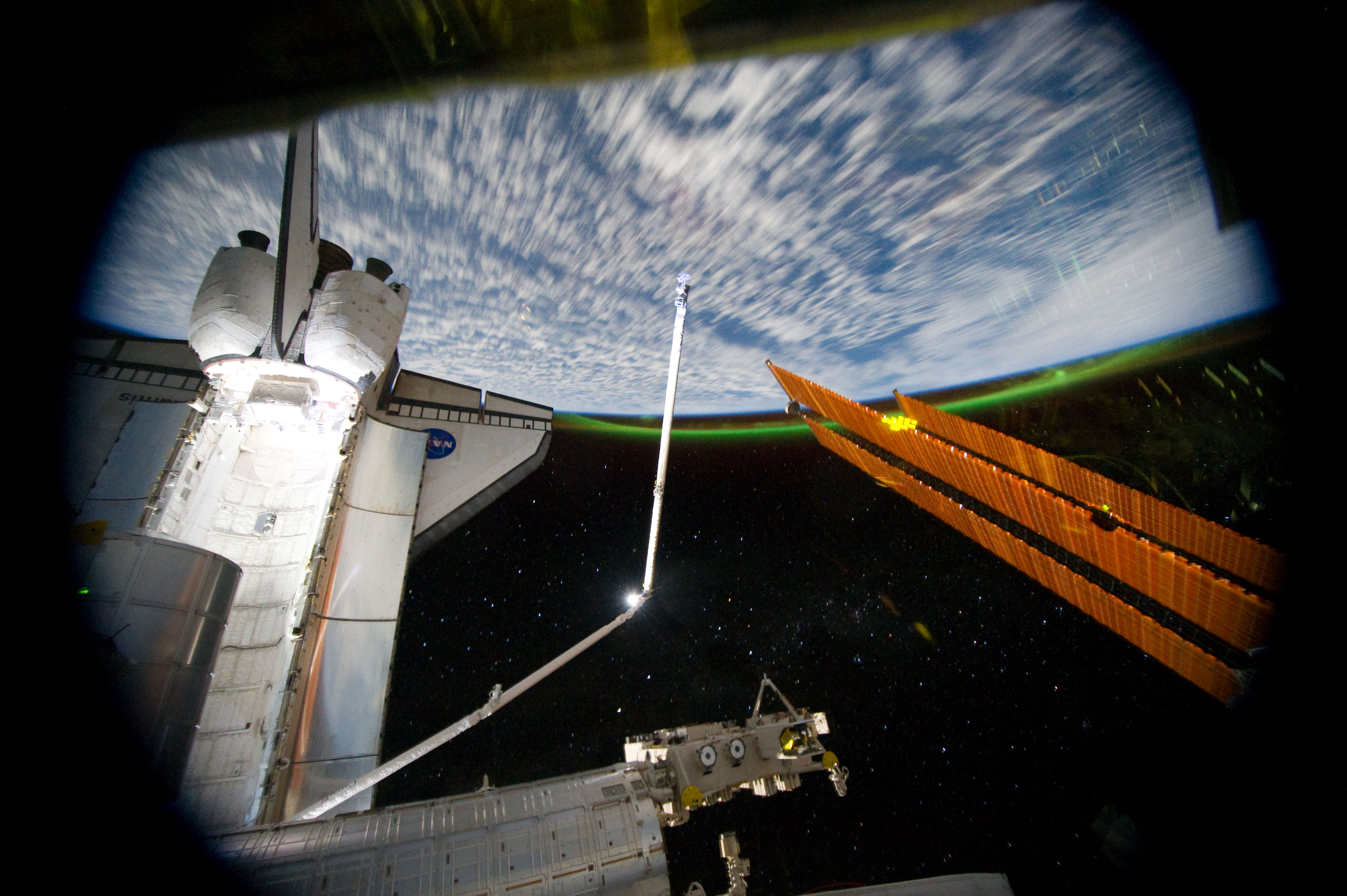
Space Shuttle Atlantis docked to the ISS for the final time

In May 2009 Atlantis flew a seven-member crew to the Hubble Space Telescope for its Servicing Mission 4, STS-125. The mission was a success, with the crew completing five spacewalks totaling 37 hours to install new cameras, batteries, a gyroscope and other components to the telescope. This was the final mission not to rendezvous with the ISS.

The longest mission flown using Atlantis was STS-117, which lasted almost 14 days in June 2007. During STS-117, Atlantis' crew added a new starboard truss segment and solar array pair (the S3/S4 truss), folded the P6 array in preparation for its relocation and performed four spacewalks. Atlantis was not equipped to take advantage of the Station-to-Shuttle Power Transfer System so missions could not be extended by making use of power provided by ISS.

During the STS-129 post-flight interview on November 16, 2009, shuttle launch director Mike Leinbach said that Atlantis officially beat Space Shuttle Discovery for the record low amount of interim problem reports, with a total of just 54 listed since returning from STS-125. Leinbach added, "It is due to the team and the hardware processing. They just did a great job. The record will probably never be broken again in the history of the Space Shuttle Program, so congratulations to them." Leinbach made a similar report during a post-launch interview on May 14, 2010, saying that there were a total of 46 listed from STS-129 to STS-132.

== Orbiter maintenance down periods ==
Atlantis went through two overhauls of scheduled orbiter maintenance down periods (OMDPs) during its operational history.

Atlantis arrived at Palmdale, California in October 1992 for OMDP-1. During that visit 165 modifications were made over the next 20 months. These included the installation of a drag chute, new plumbing lines to configure the orbiter for extended duration, improved nose wheel steering, more than 800 new heat tiles and blankets, new insulation for main landing gear, and structural modifications to the airframe.

On November 5, 1997, Atlantis again arrived at Palmdale for OMDP-2 which was completed on September 24, 1998. The 130 modifications carried out during OMDP-2 included glass cockpit displays, replacement of TACAN navigation with GPS and ISS airlock and docking installation. Several weight reduction modifications were performed on the orbiter including replacement of Advanced Flexible Reusable Surface Insulation (AFRSI) insulation blankets on upper surfaces with FRSI. Lightweight crew seats were installed and the Extended Duration Orbiter (EDO) package installed on OMDP-1 was removed to lighten Atlantis to better serve its prime mission of servicing the ISS.

During the standdown period post Columbia accident, Atlantis went through over 75 modifications to the orbiter ranging from very minor bolt change-outs to window change-outs and different fluid systems.

Atlantis was known among the shuttle workforce as being more prone than the others in the fleet to problems that needed to be addressed while readying the vehicle for launch, leading to some nicknaming it "Britney" after Britney Spears.

== Decommissioning ==
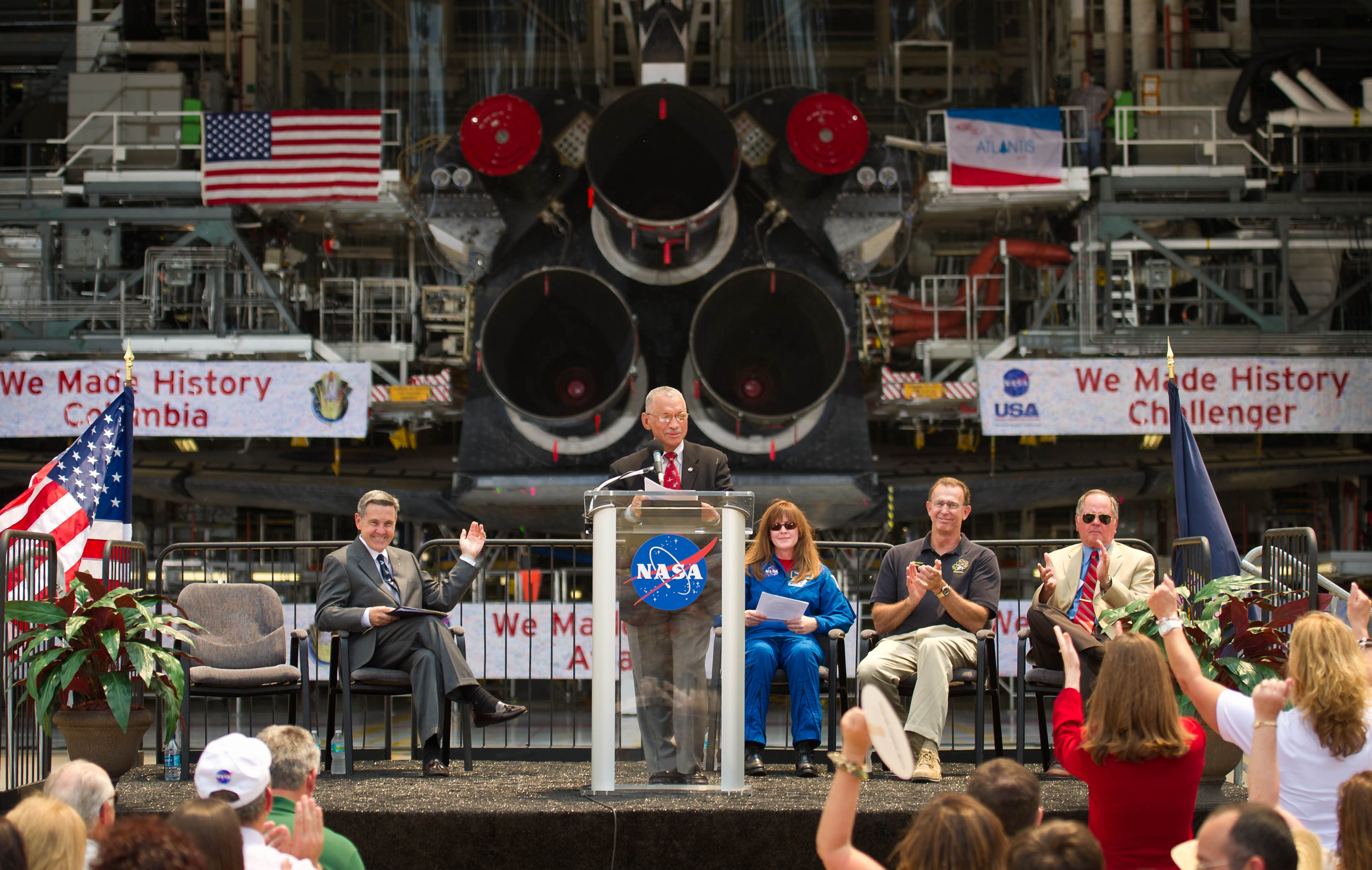
Former NASA administrator Charlie Bolden announces that Atlantis will remain at the Kennedy Space Center Visitor Complex on permanent exhibition

NASA initially planned to withdraw Atlantis from service in 2008, as the orbiter would have been due to undergo its third scheduled OMDP; the timescale of the final retirement of the shuttle fleet was such that having the orbiter undergo this work was deemed uneconomical. It was planned that Atlantis would be kept in near-flight condition to be used as a spares source for Discovery and Endeavour. However, with the significant planned flight schedule up to 2010, the decision was taken to extend the time between OMDPs, allowing Atlantis to be retained for operations. Atlantis was subsequently swapped for one flight of each Discovery and Endeavour in the flight manifest. Atlantis had completed what was meant to be its last flight, STS-132, prior to the end of the shuttle program, but the extension of the Shuttle program into 2011 led to Atlantis being selected for STS-135, the final Space Shuttle mission in July 2011.

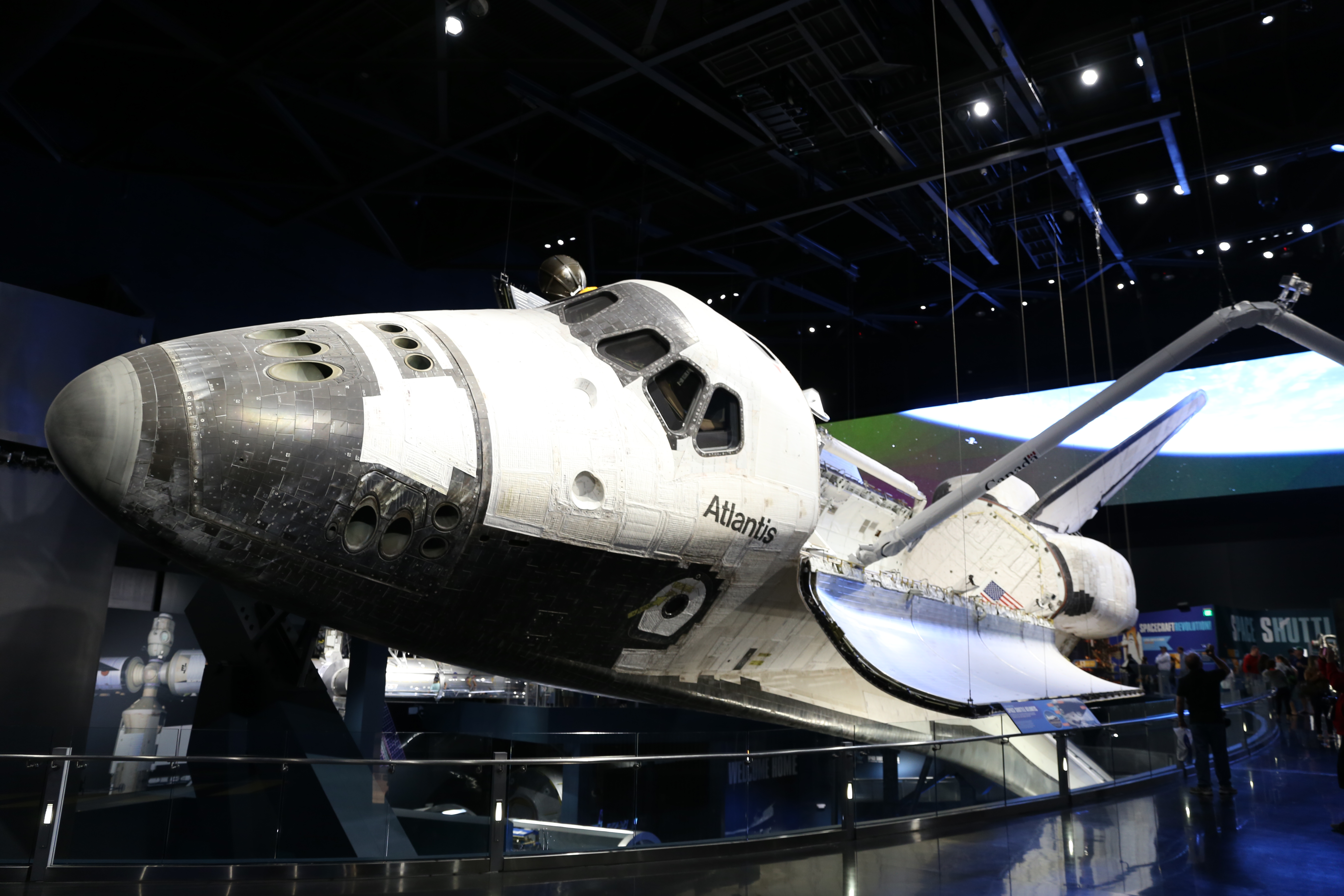
Atlantis display at the Kennedy Space Center Visitor Complex

Atlantis is currently displayed at the Kennedy Space Center Visitor Complex. NASA Administrator Charles Bolden announced the decision at an employee event held on April 12, 2011, to commemorate the 30th anniversary of the first shuttle flight: "First, here at the Kennedy Space Center where every shuttle mission and so many other historic human space flights have originated, we'll showcase my old friend, Atlantis".

The Visitor Complex displays Atlantis with payload bay doors opened mounted at a 43.21° angle to give the appearance of being in orbit around the Earth. The mount angle pays tribute to the countdown that preceded every shuttle launch at KSC. A multi-story digital projection of Earth rotates behind the orbiter in a 5,900 m^{2} (64,000 sq ft) indoor facility. Ground breaking of the facility occurred in 2012.

The exhibit opened on June 29, 2013.

== Crews ==
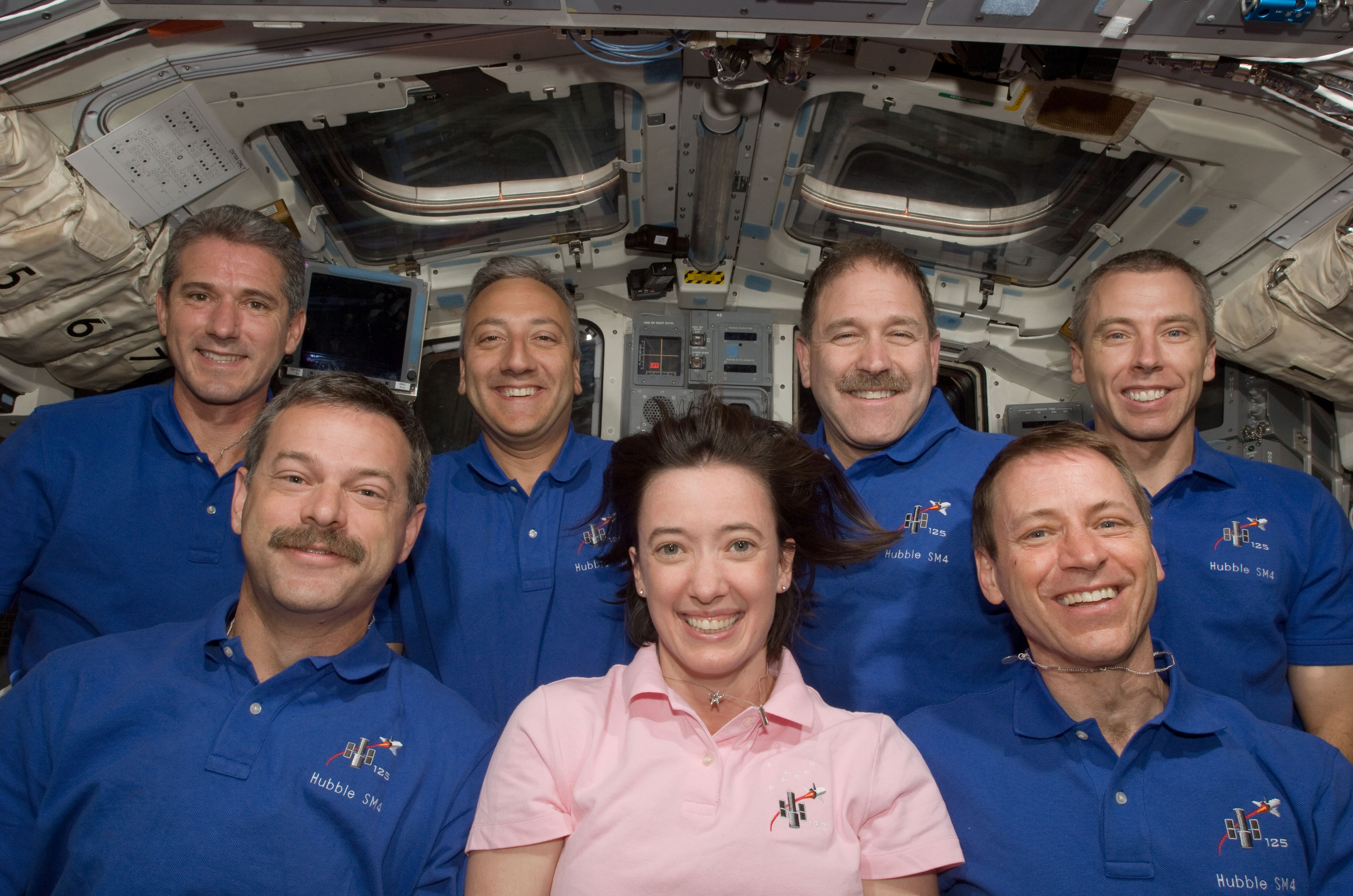
Crewmembers for the final Hubble Servicing Mission, STS-125 pose for a photo on the flight deck of Atlantis

A total of 207 individuals flew with Space Shuttle Atlantis over the course of its 33 missions. Because the shuttle sometimes flew crew members arriving and departing Mir and the ISS, not all of them launched and landed on Atlantis.

Astronaut Clayton Anderson, ESA astronaut Leopold Eyharts and Russian cosmonauts Nikolai Budarin and Anatoly Solovyev only launched on Atlantis. Similarly, astronauts Daniel Tani and Sunita Williams, as well as cosmonauts Vladimir Dezhurov and Gennady Strekalov only landed with Atlantis. Only 146 men and women both launched and landed aboard Atlantis.

Some of those people flew with Atlantis more than once. Taking them into account, 203 total seats were filled over Atlantis' 33 missions. Astronaut Jerry Ross holds the record for the most flights aboard Atlantis at five.

Astronaut Rodolfo Neri Vela who flew aboard Atlantis on STS-61-B mission in 1985 is the only Mexican to have traveled to space. ESA astronaut Dirk Frimout who flew on STS-45 as a payload specialist was the first Belgian in space. STS-46 mission specialist Claude Nicollier was the first astronaut from Switzerland. On the same flight, astronaut Franco Malerba became the first citizen of Italy to travel to space.

Astronaut Mike Massimino who flew on STS-125 mission became the first person to use Twitter in space in May 2009.

Having flown aboard Atlantis as part of the STS-132 crew in May 2010 and Discovery as part of the STS-133 crew in February/March 2011, Stephen Bowen became the first NASA astronaut to be launched on consecutive missions.

== Flights listing ==
#	Date	Designation	Launch pad	Landing location	Duration	Distance Traveled	Notes
1	October 3, 1985	STS-51-J	39A	Edwards AFB	4 days, 1 hour, 44 minutes, 38 seconds	1,682,641 miles (2,707,948 km)	First Atlantis mission; mission dedicated to Department of Defense. Deployed two DSCS-III (Defense Satellite Communications System) satellites into stationary orbit.
2	November 26, 1985	STS-61-B	39A	Edwards AFB	6 days, 21 hours, 4 minutes, 49 seconds	2,466,956 miles (3,970,181 km)	Three communications satellites deployed: MORELOS-B, AUSSAT-2 and SATCOM KU-2
3	December 2, 1988	STS-27	39B	Edwards AFB	4 days, 9 hours, 5 minutes, 37 seconds	1,812,075 miles (2,916,252 km)	Mission dedicated to Department of Defense. Deployed the Lacrosse 1 satellite, for the US National Reconnaissance Office (NRO) and the Central Intelligence Agency (CIA). Atlantis' Thermal Protection System tiles sustained unusually severe damage during the flight; over 700 damaged tiles were noted, and one tile was missing.
4	May 4, 1989	STS-30	39B	Edwards AFB	4 days, 0 hours, 56 minutes, 28 seconds	1,477,500 miles (2,377,800 km)	Deployed the Magellan probe bound for Venus.
5	October 18, 1989	STS-34	39B	Edwards AFB	4 days, 23 hours, 39 minutes, 20 seconds	1,800,000 miles (2,900,000 km)	Deployed the Galileo probe bound for Jupiter.
6	February 28, 1990	STS-36	39A	Edwards AFB	4 days, 10 hours, 18 minutes, 22 seconds	1,837,962 miles (2,957,913 km)	Mission dedicated to Department of Defense. STS-36 deployed a single satellite believed to have been a Misty reconnaissance satellite.
7	November 15, 1990	STS-38	39A	KSC	4 days, 21 hours, 54 minutes, 31 seconds	2,045,056 miles (3,291,199 km)	Mission dedicated to Department of Defense. Deployed USA-67 believed to have been a secret Magnum ELINT (ELectronic INTelligence) gathering satellite.
8	April 5, 1991	STS-37	39B	Edwards AFB	5 days, 23 hours, 32 minutes, 44 seconds	2,487,075 miles (4,002,559 km)	Deployed Compton Gamma Ray Observatory (GRO), the second of the Great Observatories program after the first successful unscheduled EVA in the Shuttle program to deploy GRO's data antenna.
9	August 2, 1991	STS-43	39A	KSC	8 days, 21 hours, 21 minutes, 25 seconds	3,700,400 miles (5,955,200 km)	Deployed TDRS-5 (TDRS-E).
10	November 24, 1991	STS-44	39A	Edwards AFB	6 days, 22 hours, 50 minutes, 44 seconds	2,890,067 miles (4,651,112 km)	Mission dedicated to Department of Defense. The unclassified payload included a Defense Support Program (DSP) satellite deployed on flight day one.
11	March 24, 1992	STS-45	39A	KSC	8 days, 22 hours, 9 minutes 28 seconds	3,274,946 miles (5,270,515 km)	Carried first Atmospheric Laboratory for Applications and Science (ATLAS-1). ATLAS-1 equipped with 12 instruments conducted studies in atmospheric chemistry, solar radiation, space plasma physics and ultraviolet astronomy.
12	July 31, 1992	STS-46	39A	KSC	7 days, 23 hours, 15 minutes, 3 seconds	3,321,007 miles (5,344,643 km)	Deployed the Tethered Satellite System (TSS), a joint NASA/Italian Space Agency experiment. The satellite only reached a maximum of 860 feet (260 m) instead of 12.5 miles (20.1 km), because of a jammed tether line. The European Retrievable Carrier (EURECA) satellite was deployed for the European Space Agency (ESA).
13	November 3, 1994	STS-66	39B	Edwards AFB	10 days, 22 hours, 34 minutes, 2 seconds	4,554,791 miles (7,330,226 km)	Carried Atmospheric Laboratory for Applications and Sciences – 3 (ATLAS-03) to study the energy of the sun and how it affects the Earth's climate and environment. In addition, STS-66 included deployment and retrieval of the Cryogenic Infrared Spectrometer Telescope for Atmosphere (CRISTA) to explore the variability of the atmosphere and provide measurements.
14	June 27, 1995	STS-71	39A	KSC	9 days, 19 hours, 22 minutes, 17 seconds	4,100,000 miles (6,600,000 km)	First Shuttle docking with space station Mir. 100th U.S. crewed space flight. Atlantis transported two cosmonauts Anatoly Solovyev and Nikolai Budarin to Mir and returned astronaut Norman Thagard and cosmonauts Vladimir Dezhurov and Gennady Strekalov. The joint U.S-Russian crew performed life sciences investigations aboard SPACELAB/Mir.
15	November 12, 1995	STS-74	39A	KSC	8 days, 4 hours, 31 minutes, 42 seconds	3,400,000 miles (5,500,000 km)	Carried docking module to Mir and docked to the Kristall module. During the three days of combined shuttle-Mir operations, Atlantis's crew transferred water, supplies, equipment and two new solar arrays to upgrade Mir.
16	March 22, 1996	STS-76	39B	Edwards AFB	9 days, 5 hours, 16 minutes, 48 seconds	3,800,000 miles (6,100,000 km)	Rendezvous with Mir, including crew transfer of Shannon Lucid. STS-76 marked first flight of SPACEHAB pressurized module to support Shuttle-Mir dockings. Spacewalkers Linda Godwin and Michael Clifford conducted the first U.S. extravehicular activity (EVA) around the two mated spacecraft.
17	September 16, 1996	STS-79	39A	KSC	10 days, 3 hours, 19 minutes, 28 seconds	3,900,000 miles (6,300,000 km)	Rendezvous with Mir, including crew transfer of Shannon Lucid and John Blaha. First shuttle mission to the fully completed Mir in its final configuration. STS-79 marked the second flight of SPACEHAB module in support of Shuttle-Mir activities and the first flight of SPACEHAB Double Module configuration.
18	January 12, 1997	STS-81	39B	KSC	10 days, 4 hours, 56 minutes, 30 seconds	3,900,000 miles (6,300,000 km)	Rendezvous with Mir, including crew transfer of John Blaha and Jerry Linenger. Carried the SPACEHAB double module and during five days of docked operations with Mir, the crews transferred water and supplies.
19	May 15, 1997	STS-84	39A	KSC	9 days, 5 hours, 20 minutes, 47 seconds	3,600,000 miles (5,800,000 km)	Rendezvous with Mir, including crew transfer of Jerry Linenger and Michael Foale. Carried the SPACEHAB double module.
20	September 25, 1997	STS-86	39A	KSC	10 days, 19 hours, 22 minutes, 12 seconds	4,225,000 miles (6,799,000 km)	Rendezvous with Mir, including crew transfer of Michael Foale and David A. Wolf. Highlights of STS-86 included five days of docked operations and the first joint U.S.-Russian spacewalk during a shuttle mission conducted by cosmonaut Vladimir Titov and astronaut Scott Parazynski.
21	May 19, 2000	STS-101	39A	KSC	9 days, 21 hours, 10 minutes, 10 seconds	5,076,281 miles (8,169,482 km)	International Space Station resupply mission with supplies carried up using a SPACEHAB double module and SPACEHAB Integrated Cargo Carrier pallet. Astronauts James Voss and Jeffrey Williams performed a spacewalk and Atlantis reboosted the ISS.
22	September 8, 2000	STS-106	39B	KSC	11 days, 19 hours, 12 minutes, 15 seconds	4,919,243 miles (7,916,754 km)	International Space Station resupply mission. STS-106 utilized the SPACEHAB Double Module and the Integrated Cargo Carrier (ICC) to bring supplies to the ISS. The mission included two spacewalks.
23	February 7, 2001	STS-98	39A	Edwards AFB	12 days, 21 hours, 21 minutes	5,369,576 miles (8,641,495 km)	International Space Station assembly mission (carried and assembled the Destiny Laboratory Module). Three spacewalks including the 100th in the U.S. human spaceflight program were conducted to complete its assembly.
24	July 12, 2001	STS-104	39B	KSC	12 days, 18 hours, 36 minutes, 39 seconds	5,309,429 miles (8,544,698 km)	International Space Station assembly mission (carried and assembled the Quest Joint Airlock). Astronauts Michael Gernhardt and James Reilly conducted three space walks while Atlantis was docked to the ISS. STS-104 was the first shuttle mission to fly with a "Block II" SSME.
25	April 8, 2002	STS-110	39B	KSC	10 days, 19 hours, 43 minutes, 48 seconds	4,525,299 miles (7,282,763 km)	International Space Station assembly mission (carried and assembled the S0 truss segment) which forms the backbone of the truss structure on the ISS. STS-110 delivered the Mobile Transporter (MT). Four spacewalks were conducted in support of ISS construction.
26	October 7, 2002	STS-112	39B	KSC	10 days, 19 hours, 58 minutes, 44 seconds	4,513,015 miles (7,262,994 km)	International Space Station assembly mission (carried and assembled the S1 truss segment). Atlantis delivered the Crew Equipment Translation Aid (CETA). Astronauts David Wolf and Piers Sellers conducted three spacewalks. A camera mounted to the shuttle's external tank captured the ascent to orbit. This was the first time such footage was recorded.
27	September 9, 2006	STS-115	39B	KSC	11 days, 19 hours, 6 minutes, 35 seconds	4,910,288 miles (7,902,343 km)	International Space Station resupply and construction (P3 and P4 truss segments, solar arrays 2A and 4A and batteries). STS-115 was the first assembly mission to the ISS after the Columbia disaster. A total of three spacewalks were performed, during which the crew connected the systems on the installed trusses, prepared them for deployment and did other maintenance work on the ISS.
28	June 8, 2007	STS-117	39A	Edwards AFB	13 days, 20 hours, 12 minutes, 44 seconds	5,809,363 miles (9,349,263 km)	International Space Station resupply and construction (S3 and S4 truss and a set of solar arrays segments) The launch of STS-117 marked the 250th orbital human spaceflight. STS-117 brought Expedition 15 crewmember Clayton Anderson to the ISS, and returned with Sunita Williams.
29	February 7, 2008	STS-122	39A	KSC	12 days, 18 hours, 21 minutes, 50 seconds	5,296,842 miles (8,524,441 km)	International Space Station construction (Columbus laboratory). STS-122 carried ESA astronaut Léopold Eyharts, a French Flight Engineer representing ESA to the ISS and returned Expedition 16 Flight Engineer Daniel M. Tani to Earth. Three spacewalks were performed by mission specialists Rex Walheim and Stanley Love.
30	May 11, 2009	STS-125	39A	Edwards AFB	12 days, 21 hours, 37 minutes, 9 seconds	5,276,000 miles (8,491,000 km)	Final Hubble Space Telescope Servicing Mission 4. Atlantis carried two new instruments to the Hubble Space Telescope, the Cosmic Origins Spectrograph and the Wide Field Camera 3. The mission replaced a Fine Guidance Sensor, six gyroscopes, and two battery unit modules. The mission included five spacewalks totaling 37 hours. STS-125 carried an IMAX camera to document the progress of the mission.
31	November 16, 2009	STS-129	39A	KSC	10 days, 19 hours, 16 minutes, 13 seconds	4,490,138 miles (7,226,177 km)	International Space Station resupply and construction (ELC-1/ELC-2). STS-129 was the first flight of an ExPRESS Logistics Carrier and focused on staging spare components outside the space station. The mission included three spacewalks.
32	May 14, 2010	STS-132	39A	KSC	11 days, 18 hours, 29 minutes, 09 seconds	4,879,978 miles (7,853,563 km)	International Space Station construction (Mini-Research Module 1 and the cargo pallet, Integrated Cargo Carrier-Vertical Light Deployable (ICC-VLD)). The mission included three spacewalks.
33	July 8, 2011	STS-135	39A	KSC	12 days, 18 hours, 28 minutes, 50 seconds	5,284,862 miles (8,505,161 km)	International Space Station resupply using the Raffaello Multi-Purpose Logistics Module and the Lightweight Multi-Purpose Carrier (LMC). The failed ammonia pump module that was replaced in August 2010 returned inside Atlantis' payload bay. This was the final mission of Space Shuttle Atlantis and the last mission for the Space Shuttle Program. STS-135 flew with a crew of four astronauts; the reduced crew size allowed for rescue by regularly scheduled Soyuz missions if necessary.

== Problems ==
=== Composite overwrapped pressure vessels ===
NASA announced in 2007 that 24 helium and nitrogen gas tanks in Atlantis were older than their designed lifetime. These composite overwrapped pressure vessels (COPV) were designed for a 10-year life and later cleared for an additional 10 years; they exceeded this life in 2005. NASA said it could not guarantee any longer that the vessels on Atlantis would not burst or explode under full pressure. Failure of these tanks could have damaged parts of the orbiter and even wound or kill ground personnel. An in-flight failure of a pressure vessel could have even resulted in the loss of the orbiter and its crew. NASA analyses originally assumed that the vessels would leak before they burst, but new tests showed that they could in fact burst before leaking.

Because the original vendor was no longer in business, and a new manufacturer could not be qualified before 2010, when the shuttles were scheduled to be retired, NASA decided to continue operations with the existing tanks. Therefore, to reduce the risk of failure and the cumulative effects of load, the vessels were maintained at 80 percent of the operating pressure as late in the launch countdown as possible, and the launch pad was cleared of all but essential personnel when pressure was increased to 100 percent. The new launch procedure was employed during some of the remaining launches of Atlantis, but was resolved when the two COPVs deemed to have the highest risk of failure were replaced.

=== Window damage ===
After the STS-125 mission, a work light knob was discovered jammed in the space between one of Atlantis's front interior windows and the Orbiter dashboard structure. The knob was believed to have entered the space during flight, when the pressurized Orbiter was expanded to its maximum size. Then, once back on Earth, the Orbiter contracted, jamming the knob in place. Leaving "as-is" was considered unsafe for flight, and some options for removal (including window replacement) would have included a 6-month delay of Atlantis's next mission (planned to be STS-129). Had the removal of the knob been unsuccessful, the worst-case scenario was that Atlantis could have been retired from the fleet, leaving Discovery and Endeavour to complete the manifest alone. On June 29, 2009, Atlantis was pressurized to 17 psi (120 kPa) (3 psi above ambient), which forced the Orbiter to expand slightly. The knob was then frozen with dry ice, and successfully removed. Small areas of damage to the window were discovered where the edges of the knob had been embedded into the pane. Subsequent investigation of the window damage discovered a maximum defect depth of approximately 0.0003 in (7.6 μm), less than the reportable depth threshold of 0.0015 in (38 μm) and not serious enough to warrant the pane's replacement.

== Gallery ==
Liftoff of first flight of Atlantis and the STS-51-J mission	Deployment of the Magellan space probe to Venus on STS-30	Underside view of Atlantis during STS-117 as it approached the International Space Station and performed a Rendezvous Pitch Maneuver	Atlantis landing at the Kennedy Space Center following STS-122
Atlantis carrying the S1 Truss segment on mission STS-112	Atlantis and its STS-125 crew head toward Earth orbit and rendezvous with the Hubble Space Telescope	Space Shuttle Atlantis after it undocked from the International Space Station on September 17, 2006	The Space Shuttle Atlantis landing in 1997, at the end of STS-86
Atlantis on top of the Shuttle Carrier Aircraft in 1998	An overhead view of Atlantis as it sits atop the Mobile Launcher Platform before STS-79	An overhead image of Atlantis during STS-115, as recorded by an Expedition 13 crew member on board the International Space Station	The Hubble Space Telescope aboard Atlantis during the STS-125 mission
Atlantis' final launch at the beginning of the STS-135 mission	Atlantis' final landing at the end of the STS-135 mission	A welcome home ceremony is held for Atlantis at the Orbiter Processing Facility following the STS-135 mission	Atlantis in its final exhibit display at Kennedy Space Center Visitor Complex

=== Tribute and mission insignias ===
NASA Orbiter Tribute for Space Shuttle Atlantis
Mission insignia for Atlantis flights
STS-51-J	STS-61-B	STS-61-G*	STS-27	STS-30	STS-34	STS-36
STS-38	STS-37	STS-43	STS-44	STS-45	STS-46	STS-66
STS-71	STS-74	STS-76	STS-79	STS-81	STS-84	STS-86
STS-101	STS-106	STS-98	STS-104	STS-110	STS-112	STS-115
STS-117	STS-122	STS-125	STS-129	STS-132	STS-135	

== In media ==
- The 1986 film SpaceCamp involves a crew of students at United States Space Camp that are accidentally launched into space on-board Atlantis.
- The 1990 novel Earth by David Brin includes Atlantis, depicted as stranded on Rapa Nui in tribute to G. Harry Stine's serialized novel Shuttle Down, published in 1980.
- Atlantis is featured in the 1998 science-fiction film Deep Impact, in which it is used to transport astronauts to the orbiting "Messiah" spacecraft at the start of their comet intercept mission.
- Atlantis is also featured in, and destroyed in, the 1998 science-fiction film Armageddon, which was released almost two months after Deep Impact.
- Atlantis is the setting and title of episode 2 of season 1 of the revived continuation of the TV series Quantum Leap, which features a fictional mission set between the real 1997 and 2000 missions (STS-86 and STS-101).
- Atlantis was featured in the British program Chucklevision's episode "Kidnapped", in which Paul & Barry Chuckle were looking for Dan the Van but a lady redirected them to the Space Shuttle Atlantis; footage from STS-45 was used.
- A dual finned space shuttle inspired by Atlantis appeared in the 2010 anime movie Metal Fight Beyblade vs the Sun: Sol Blaze, the Scorching Hot Invader.

== See also ==
- List of human spaceflights
- List of Space Shuttle crews
- List of Space Shuttle missions
- STS-135
