= Quantum fiction =

Literary genre with philosophical influences from quantum mechanics

Quantum fiction is a genre of speculative fiction that reflects modern experience of the material world and reality as influenced by quantum theory and new principles in quantum physics. It is characterized by the use of an element in quantum mechanics as a storytelling device. The genre is not necessarily science-themed, and blurs the line separating science fiction and fantasy into a broad scope of mainstream literature that transcends the mechanical model of science and involves the fantasy of human perception or imagination as realistic components affecting the everyday physical world.

Novels that have been described as quantum fiction include Vanna Bonta's Flight: A Quantum Fiction Novel (1995), M. John Harrison's Empty Space trilogy (2002, 2006, 2012), David Mitchell's Cloud Atlas (2004), Scarlett Thomas's The End of Mr. Y (2006) Samantha Harvey's The Wilderness (2008), and Andrew Crumey's Sputnik Caledonia (2008).

Charles Platt introduced the term in his essay "Quantum Fiction: A Blueprint for Avoiding Literary Obsolescence", first published in The New York Review of Science Fiction in April 1990.

== Origin of the genre ==
The term had been suggested in 1990 by Charles Platt. Though, novelist Vanna Bonta claimed to have coined the term quantum fiction in 1996, when she published her novel Flight: A Quantum Fiction Novel. In Bonta's novel, the protagonist struggles to distinguish real life from elements in a novel he is writing, as people and events from his novel begin to appear in reality.

Bonta defined quantum fiction as stories in which consciousness affects physics and determines reality; in her words, "the genre is broad and includes life." Bonta further explained her development of this new genre: "I don't write science fiction. Science fiction is a niche genre, defined by Ray Bradbury as depiction of the real. 'Quantum fiction' is the realm of all possibilities. The genre is broad, and includes life because fiction is an inextricable part of reality in its various stages, and vice versa."

According to Christina Scholz, on Platt's inclusion of the term:

Platt envisioned quantum fiction as a way to revitalise the [science fiction] genre, acknowledging the observer (i.e. reader) as an active participant. As in quantum physics, the outcome of an observation (the storyline created in the reading process) depends on the questions asked by the observer (reader). His examples of possible quantum fiction influences include hypertext and the Choose Your Own Adventure series, Burroughs’ cut-up technique, Ballard’s ‘condensed novels’ containing multiple segmented perspectives, multimedia experimentation, and James Joyce's Finnegans Wake. Like Kurt Vonnegut's novels, quantum fiction should be composed of small quanta. Readers should have random access to these quanta (implying a sort of Brownian motion version of the reading process). Multiple viewpoints should be used. The prose should be terse, focussed, visual and graphic, the content presented ‘accurate and informational’. Platt also encourages a multimedia approach, including the use of other visual material. However, in the end, this prescriptive definition of quantum fiction remains experimental and restrictive.

== New forms of storytelling ==
Usage of the term quantum fiction began to appear in 21st-century books and academic papers that identified and discussed a new and emerging literary genre that is affected by the new view of the world given by quantum physics. Various artists, academia, and critics explored it independently of one another and in various contexts with the common denominator of a new literary genre. By 2010, hindsight reveals a movement and usage by multiple authors and critics.

In his book Loose Canon (Cosmos Press, 2001), author Charles Platt describes quantum fiction as "a blueprint for avoiding literary obsolescence." Platt writes: "I do believe that "Quantum Fiction" would circumvent some problems associated with traditional science fiction." Platt argues, "If a nineteenth-century writer such as Charles Dickens sampled a few modern science-fiction novels, he might be surprised by the writing style and the speculative content, but he'd find nothing new in the methods of storytelling. Popular novel-length narratives are built basically the same way today as a century ago, and science-fiction writers are in the ironic position of depicting the future using techniques derived entirely from the past." Platt writes, "My own modest proposal for revitalizing the novel is a form that I will call, for want of a better term, "quantum fiction." Like the quantum theory, it acknowledges the observer (in this case, the reader) as an active participant." In 2001, Platt states, "I believe it should be possible to develop from these prototypes a new genre of "quantum fiction" with genuinely broad appeal."

In Sonia Front's Shapes of Time in British Twenty-First Century Quantum Fiction (2015), novels chosen as representative of the genre in Britain were Andrew Crumey's Sputnik Caledonia, David Mitchell's Cloud Atlas, Samantha Harvey's The Wilderness and Scarlett Thomas's The End of Mr. Y.

== Literary technique ==
A literary genre, as a category of literary composition, is determined by literary technique, tone, or subject matter (content). Quantum fiction as a genre is primarily defined by technique of writing, and tone and subject matter is not limited.

=== Differences from science fiction ===
Unlike science fiction which is largely defined by content, the subject matter of a quantum fiction can be anything. Quantum fiction stories are about any subject matter and do not necessarily involve science. The storytelling itself, e.g., treatment of plot (time), characters (observers), location (multiple worlds, parallel selves), is unconventional. Quantum fiction can also hinge on theoretical physics as a subject element of a story. Quantum fiction deals in possibility and probability.

In The Amazing Story of Quantum Mechanics, physicist James Kakalios explains how it was the development of quantum mechanics that enabled the wonders enjoyed in the 21st century, not the classical model science-based predictions. As a young science fiction fan in the 1950s and 1960s, Kakalios marveled at the future predicted in science fiction pulp magazines, comics, and films of that era, and he was certain that by 2010 humanity would have flying cars and jet packs. Instead, there are far more fantastic marvels, such as laptop computers, MRI machines, Blu-ray players, and other real-life wonders made manifest via quantum mechanics.

Using the interpretation of quantum theory that physical reality exists only when it is observed, therefore in the mind, the genre of quantum fiction is more closely related to idealism than the genre of empirical classic science fiction. In this regard, other creative works can be seen as subcategories of quantum fiction and even science, or reality itself, is a work of fiction.

=== Quantum theory as literary device ===
In the fiction of Guyanese novelist and poet Wilson Harris, the author's style, which he defines as quantum fiction, is by way of technique, of narrative structure. In a thesis exploring Harris's literary genre of The Carnival Trilogy as quantum fiction, Rebekka Eklund describes "In his ambitiously experimental writing, Harris creates a narrative structure which is multiple and flexible." It is Harris's treatment of ordinary characters and events, unrelated to science per se, that defines the genre. In interviews, Harris often describes the effects of quantum perception on the literary process, techniques and devices.

Wilson Harris described he has been writing since his first novel what he was to eventually realize as quantum fiction, to give witness to "realities hidden from the world you see." In the dissertation Quantum Value in Wilson Harris's "Architecture of the Tides, Andrew Jefferson–Miles states: "In quantum fiction, the whole cosmos is involved, and that cosmos will leave its trace, its spontaneous quantum of knowing and recognizing, on even the smallest, shortest-lived thing."

In the volume Redefining the Critical Enterprise in Twenty-First Century Hispanic Literature (Hybrid 2012), Spanish author Jorge Carrión writes: "My books attempt to problematize these supposed units of meaning, because perhaps we are in a time of quantum fiction. I repeat: "quantum fiction." This is a concept I have been working on for a very short time. It is a new concept, like "counter-space" or "theoryphobia" were in their time."

In 2009, in a doctoral thesis on the Science of Art, Alexis Blanchet defines the necessity of the quantum fiction genre distinction. "Fictional worlds now appear as shifting and undefined as ever to audiences. The notion of quantum fiction aims to provide a framework of production and reception to the contemporary processes of industrialization and diversification of fiction."

In quantum fiction, the author perceives and creates characters who experience reality with a surreal or nonlinear view of things that does not correspond with the way the physical senses generally experience life and the world, and that behaves in ways posited by quantum theory.

=== Characteristics of the genre ===
The genre has also been characterized as having any or all of the following characteristics:

- The author's invocation of quantum mechanics to make possible supernatural, paranormal, or fantastic elements of a story in which reality appears to defy the laws of physics;
- A character as a consciously influencing observer of reality;
- The scientific recognition of an unquantified animating force of matter measured by an observer, posited as consciousness or spirit;
- A theme, character, or events of a story existing per an element explainable as reality according to quantum theory;
- Adventures involving synchronicity, multiple-dimension reality, interactive metaverses, parallel worlds, or the multiverse;
- Consciousness (a character or a reader) as an interactive influence in the creation and perception of reality and plot line;
- Reality behaving unpredictably as per subatomic particles.

== Quantum theory ==
Quantum fiction brings quantum theory forward as the explanation behind the concept of life imitating art and art imitating life via substantiation of literary plot developments, time sequence, character experiences and other literary elements based on quantum mechanics. The term Quantum fiction is etymologically based on the discovery of Max Planck, who first used the word quantum to describe the minute forces at play in the realm of physics. The field was pioneered by quantum physicists Erwin Schrödinger, Werner Heisenberg, Wolfgang Pauli, Niels Bohr, and Eugene Wigner, as well as contentions of Louis DeBroglie, Max von Laue and Albert Einstein. One contention, among others, is that quantum mechanics is a statistical approximation to a deeper reality which behaves predictably via the observer being an inextricable part of reality (observer effect (physics)).

As quantum theories such as wave–particle duality and the behavior of matter on a subatomic behavior evolves, theories have emerged that life is central to being, reality, and the cosmos. Biocentrism, a theory proposed in 2007 by American scientist Robert Lanza, posits that life creates the universe rather than the other way around. Biocentric theory claims to build on quantum physics (although the author isn't a physicist himself), and this view asserts that current theories of the physical world do not work, and can never be made to work, until they fully account for life and consciousness.

New findings in particle physics and quantum mechanics are revising previously held views of reality, raising questions about the influence of ideas, human thought and other uncharted causalities in its creation.

=== Examples of quantum reality in fiction ===
In quantum fiction, an author can create characters (the observers) within the work of literature to experience or affect reality (time, place, the material world) via any number of aspects of quantum mechanics, as distinct from classical mechanics. Works of quantum fiction can also introduce reality affected as spooky action at a distance, proved by Alain Aspect, as the course of everyday reality. In quantum fiction, seemingly mundane events can be written as a many-branched tree, wherein every possible quantum outcome is realized in some time line, as posited by the Hugh Everett many-worlds interpretation.

In Bonta's definitive 1995 Flight: a quantum fiction novel, the protagonist is a writer writing a novel within the novel. The character is a metaphor for the observer (any human being living, observing and interacting with reality). The writer begins to notice coincidences between what he is writing (about a girl in a parallel world) and his real life. Further, the protagonist in the novel mentions Bonta, the Flight author, thereby adding yet another parallel reality to the novel's two plot lines. Another quantum element that recurs in the book is via coincidences the characters experience, not by way of the mystical, but as a technique by which Bonta structures synchronicity as a device of quantum entanglement, the behavior of all matter connected on a subatomic level and intersecting by participation of the observers. Bonta's quantum fiction novel posits a quantum animism and the mind as permeating the world at every level. Bonta first depicts some of the novel's characters as otherwise invisible and non-material "observers" of reality, then quantifies them via their impact on reality through a process of elimination, hence making human consciousness central to the novel as both witness as well as co-creator of reality, a view posited by quantum theory.

=== New art of fiction: quantum vs. linear ===
Novelist Wilson Harris stated he realized what he was writing was quantum fiction, and further described it as giving witness to "realities hidden from the world you see." He describes, "The quantum concept is that if one fires out an object, it breaks into particles and waves. Conventional novelists go along a linear road, but the quantum split can bring the past into the present in a new art of fiction." Wilson is describing how Many-worlds interpretation and wave-particle duality appear in and define the genre of his novels, and how it affects every day characters, not otherwise related to science per se in theme.

In 2003, when interviewed by British-Guyanese poet, novelist and playwright Fred D'Aguiar, Harris describes: "'Quantum' brings a hand in fiction that challenges all conventional fixtures of control within the psyche of art." Harris explains that an awareness of the "mystery of consciousness" as actuated by quantum theory brings different patterns of control in a work of fiction, and he correlates his construction of plot and narrative to a technique he later came to realize as a new technique in literature. "The language of conventional, linear fiction, which seems so strong, becomes an illusion and is broken by quantum holes," Harris describes. In a dissertation that reviews a Harris trilogy, Rebekka Edlund analyzes his structure as "linearity replaced by simultaneous possibilities, or "polyhistory," and argues the consequences on literature of a reality as "quantum stuff" is that linear storytelling becomes obsolete.

== Emerging genre ==
In Fiction in the Quantum Universe (June 2002), Susan Strehle argues that new fiction has developed from the influence of modern physics. This book explores and advances a pluralistic view of the meaning of contemporary fiction as it relates to the quantum-defined view of "reality."

While quantum fiction novels diverge markedly from a previously held view of reality, Strehle argues that they do so in order to reflect more acutely that aspect of reality which, only the advent of quantum mechanics evidenced as real, or actual; i.e., Reality is no longer "realistic." In the new physical or quantum universe, reality is discontinuous, energetic, relative, statistical, subjectively seen, and uncertainly known—all terms taken from new physics.

Storytelling technique of quantum fiction, regardless of content, time period or setting, is executed via various literary techniques that pattern a literary work according to quantum behavior as opposed to mechanical physical reality. Devices of the technique include nonlinear plots and timelines unfolding in lives of characters or the narrator, or a characters experience of quantum reality, such as the infinite possibilities of being able to die and live multiple times, and with the creator's awareness, whether intended or not, of the interconnectedness of everything and a fluid behavior of reality that can appear surreal. Life, whether fictional or real, is no longer a world that behaves as old Newtonian physics that perceives atoms as the smallest unit of being. Quantum theory is a radically new view of the universe as fluid and interconnected, influencing the fundamental technique, by which stories are told in a literary genre identified as quantum fiction. It is more the way stories are told and fictional realities behave, not what they are about.

Since the inception and coining work of quantum fiction recognized by Publishers Weekly in 1995, the influence and definition of literature by this as a genre is evidenced in the creation of novels, short fiction, calls for submissions, television and film. In 1999, Debra Di Blasi categorizes one of her stories as quantum fiction in the collection Prayers of an Accidental Nature: Stories.

In 1996, Aesthetics and Ethics, Literary Criticism, Vol. 41, talks about a literary genre "quantum fiction": "Charles Platt has evidenced a form he has decided to call, 'for want of a better term, quantum fiction'."

Editorial reviews of new fiction recognize and analyze the defining and qualifying elements of the distinct genre of quantum fiction, which vary from work to work.

The term quantum fiction began to appear as usage by authors to define a genre work that was not necessarily science-based, and perceived the mundane through understanding of quantum reality. Authors also employ quantum behavior and structure of written works as literary devices, such as non-linear storytelling. In 2001, when Charles Platt wrote that he believed quantum fiction would circumvent some of the problems with science fiction, he stated "...and the only person who tried to use this form was me (in my novel Protektor, Avon Books)."

A 2002 university dissertation on humanities and social sciences, in the chapter "Quantum Scripts", examines the question of what knowledge quantum fiction requires its readers to have.

The technique of constructing a quantum plot and narrative first person in the story-telling of Wilson Harris grew from his approach to perception of life and language. Harris states that "across the years" he then recognized it as native to the fiction he wrote. Harris credits Quantum Reality, the nonfiction book by physicist Nick Herbert, as initially sparking his interest of how quantum theory conceives a world view of "simultaneous possibilities." After reading quantum theory, it defined for him how he had instinctively been writing. He stated he realized his method of storytelling, the technique, not content, was quantum fiction.

Quantum theory postulates a surreal view of things that does not correspond with the way we generally experience the world, and which is not explained by mechanical laws of the physical world. Unlike science fiction, which the California Department of Education defines as a "story based on impact of actual, imagined, or potential science, usually set in the future or on other planets," quantum fiction is a literary technique that relies more on literary fiction than genre writing. It is unlimited to content or subject, and authors craft ordinary characters through sensibilities and perception affected by the quantum view of the world.

The term is used by Susan H. Young in her book Quantum Fiction: Relativity and Postmodernism in Lawrence Durrell's The Alexandria Quartet (2000) to retrospectively best categorize the genre of novels by Lawrence Durrell published in 1957–1960. Durrell's tetralogy presents three perspectives on a single set of events and characters in Alexandria, Egypt World War II. Durrell explains the four novels are an exploration of relativity and the notions of continuum and subject–object relation.

In a 1959 Paris Review interview, Durrell described the ideas behind the Quartet in terms of a convergence of Eastern and Western metaphysics, based on Einstein's overturning of the old view of the material universe, yielding a new concept of reality.

Other retrospective categorization includes the vanguard work of Australian author Greg Egan who focused on a model of consciousness and reality in his 1994 novel Permutation City.

A science fiction novel, Stars in My Pocket Like Grains of Sand, by Samuel R. Delany is described as quantum fiction in a literary reference volume, not by way of subject matter or futurism, but defined by Delany's technique of "reflecting the radical uncertainty of quantum fiction in his world view and fictive discourse."

Discussion about the emerging genre of quantum fiction is the subject of 21st century academic papers and some university courses. In 2006, in a dissertation about quantum mechanics and modern fiction, Samuel Sean Kinch discusses the work of Nicholas Mosley as quantum fiction and cites Susan Strehle's Fiction in the Quantum Universe as an organized analysis of the emerging genre. He writes, "To date, Strehle offers the most systematic poetics of quantum fiction."

In 2007, Samuel Coale began teaching a college course on quantum theory's influences and effects upon contemporary American fiction. Coale presents his theories in several papers. In Quantum Flux and Narrative Flow: Don DeLillo's Entanglements with Quantum Theory, Coale presents novels by Don DeLillo and discusses DeLillo's use of quantum theory and how it is revealed in the structure and style of his novels. Other topics include similarities between quantum theory and postmodernism, the themes of perception and time and space in DeLillo's work, and religious interpretation. In the essay "Psychic Visions and Quantum Physics: Oates' Big Bang and The Limits of Language," Coale analyzes the literary style of novelist Joyce Carol Oates. According to the Coale, the characters of Oates are indicating that the individual self recognizes the strange and unfathomable otherness at the mysterious center of self-hood.

Alexis Blanchet's 2009 dissertation and doctoral thesis mentions quantum fiction, and argues the new genre quantum fiction is a necessary framework genre for relationships between fiction, cinema, and video game involving life and interactive participation as overlapping of realities. In a 2007 interview about quantum fiction, Vanna Bonta states: "As people become more aware of this universe as a quantum universe, it will embrace things like holographic entertainment experiences. Already, virtual reality and virtual interaction are an element of quantum fiction."

In 2013, Scientific American launched a quantum fiction short fiction competition headed up by Mariette DiChristina in cooperation with the Centre for Quantum Technologies at the National University of Singapore. Elements of quantum reality were broken down into simplified concepts that could be woven into fiction. Science fiction publishers and editors joined the specialized literary event.

=== As "actualism" ===
Susan Strehle explores how the changed physical world appears in both content and form in recent fiction, calling it "actualism" after the observations of Werner Heisenberg. It is characterized by incompletions, indeterminacy, or "open" endings that involve the reader or some undetermined element to continue or resolve the work. Within that framework, Gravity's Rainbow is cited as an example as it ends not with a period but with a dash. Strehle sets forth that although important recent narratives diverge markedly from realistic practice, they do so in order to reflect more acutely on what we now understand as real.

Within this framework, Strehle's book also presents a critical analysis of major novels by Thomas Pynchon, Robert Coover, William Gaddis, John Barth, Margaret Atwood, and Donald Barthelme.

Strehle argues that such innovations in narrative reflect on 20th-century history, politics, science, and discourse.

The perception of a changed reality reaches into philosophy, psychology, literary theory, and other areas. The final chapter extends the discussion beyond North American borders to African, South American, and European texts, suggesting a global community of writers whose fiction belongs in the quantum universe.

== Titles ==
=== Novels ===
Books described, reviewed or retrospectively categorized as quantum fiction:

(incomplete list)

- Anathem, by Neal Stephenson (2008)
- Beautiful Shining People by Michael Grothaus (2023)
- Running Away, by Jean-Philippe Toussaint (2005)
- The Time Traveler's Wife, by Audrey Niffenegger (2003)
- Quarantine, by Greg Egan (1992)
- Permutation City, by Greg Egan (1994)
- Flight: A Quantum Fiction Novel, by Vanna Bonta (1995)
- Protektor, by Charles Platt (1996)
- The Eyre Affair, by Jasper Fforde (2001)
- 'Kefahuchi Tract trilogy', by M John Harrison (2002)
- Mobius Dick, by Andrew Crumey (2004)
- Ghost of Memory, by Wilson Harris (2006)
- Palace of the Peacock, by Wilson Harris
- Our Tragic Universe, by Scarlett Thomas (2010)
- EDGE, by Koji Suzuki (2011)
- Hopeful Monsters, by Nicholas Mosley (2000)
- The Alexandria Quartet, by Lawrence Durrell (1957–1960)
- The Invention of Morel, by Adolfo Bioy Casares (1940)
- It Happened in Boston? (20th Century Rediscoveries), by Russell H. Greenan (1968)
- Timeline by Michael Crichton (1999)
- In Other Worlds, by A. A. Attanasio (1985)

=== Television ===
On March 1, 2012, NBC premiered the quantum fiction television series Awake, in which the protagonist lives in parallel realities with differing circumstances.

- Alien Encounters (2012)

=== Plays ===
- Constellations by Nick Payne (2000)

=== Other ===
- Tolkien's legendarium, by J.R.R. Tolkien (1914–1973)
- Honkai: Star Rail, a video game by miHoYo (2023)

== See also ==
- Biocentrism (cosmology)
- Magic realism
- Observer (quantum physics)
