= Anna Rutherford =

Australian-born academic and publisher (1932–2001)

- Born: 27 November 1932; Mayfield, New South Wales, Australia
- Died: 21 February 2001 (aged 68); Sydney, Australia
- Occupations: Academic, publisher and editor
- Known for: Founder of Kunapipi: Journal of Postcolonial Writing & Culture and Dangaroo Press

Anna Rutherford (27 November 1932 – 21 February 2001) was an Australian-born academic and publisher, who helped to establish the field of post-colonial literature in Europe.

== Biography ==
Rutherford was born in Australia in Mayfield, Newcastle, New South Wales, the daughter of a steelworker. She studied at Newcastle University College, graduating with a first-class degree, after which she went to England and worked as a teacher. In 1966, she was employed as a lecturer in Commonwealth literature at the University of Aarhus, in Denmark.

From 1968 to 1996, she was Director of the Commonwealth Literature Centre at the University of Aarhus, Denmark, where she introduced African and West Indian courses, organising in 1971 the first European conference on the British Commonwealth novel. She was considered the key figure in the Association for Commonwealth Language and Literature Study (ACLALS).

In 1979, Rutherford founded Kunapipi: Journal of Postcolonial Writing & Culture, which developed from the Commonwealth Newsletter she had established in 1971 for members of ACLALS. She was editor of Kunapipi until her death. The name derives from Kunapipi, a mother goddess in Aboriginal Australian mythology.

Rutherford also founded and was director of the small publishing company Dangaroo Press.

In 1996, Rutherford returned to Australia, taking Kunapipi and Dangaroo Press with her. That year, an edited collection, A Talent(ed) Digger, was published in Rutherford's honour. She was a visiting fellow at Warwick University in 1998.

Rutherford, who had been living in a flat overlooking Nobby's Beach, died in her sleep at a friend's house in Sydney on 21 February 2001, aged 68.

== Works ==
- (ed. with Donald Hannah) Commonwealth Short Stories. London: Edward Arnold, 1971.
- (ed. with Kirsten Holst Petersen) Cowries and Kobos: the West African oral tale and short story. Mundelstrup, Denmark: Dangaroo Press, 1981.
- Silas Marner: Notes. Harlow: Longman, 1981. York Notes, 98.
- George Eliot, Middlemarch: Notes. Harlow: Longman, 1985. York Notes, 260.
- (ed. with Kirsten Holst Petersen) A Double Colonization: Colonial and Post-colonial Women's Writing. Mundelstrup, Denmark; Oxford: Dangaroo Press, 1986.
- (ed.) Aboriginal Culture Today. Sydney: Dangaroo Press, 1988.
- (ed. with Kirsten Holst Petersen) Displaced Persons. Sydney: Dangaroo Press, 1988.
- (ed. with Hena Maes-Jelinek and Kirsten Holst Petersen) A Shaping of Connections: Commonwealth literature studies, then and now: essays in honour of A.N. Jeffares. Sydney, N.S.W.: Dangaroo Press, 1989.
- (ed. with Kirsten Holst Petersen) Chinua Achebe: a celebration. Oxford: Heinemann, 1990.
- (ed. with Kirsten Holst Petersen) On Shifting Sands: new art and literature from South Africa. Earlsdon: Dangaroo Press, 1991.
- (ed.) From Commonwealth to Post-colonial. Sydney; Coventry: Dangaroo, 1992.
- (ed.) Populous Places: Australia's cities and towns. Sydney; Coventry: Dangaroo, 1992.
- (ed. with Shirley Chew) Unbecoming Daughters of the Empire. Sydney, N.S.W.: Dangaroo Press, 1993.
- (ed. with Lars Jensen and Shirley Chew) Into the Nineties: post-colonial women's writing. Armidale, N.S.W.: Dangaroo Press, 1994.
- (ed. with Susheila Nasta) Tiger's Triumph: Celebrating Sam Selvon. Armidale, N.S.W.; Hebden Bridge: Dangaroo, 1995.
- (ed. with Anne Collett and Lars Jensen) Teaching Post-colonialism and Post-colonial Literatures. Aarhus, Denmark; Oakville, Conn.: Aarhus University Press, 1997.
- (ed. with James Wieland) War: Australia's Creative Response. St. Leonards, NSW, Australia: Allen & Unwin, 1997.
