= Rod Edmond =

New Zealand-English historian

Rod Edmond is a New Zealand writer and academic, specialising in cultural history and British Empire studies.

Edmond was born in Hamilton, New Zealand, and studied at Victoria University and Merton College, Oxford. He was Professor of Modern Literature and Cultural History at the University of Kent until his retirement in 2009. His books include Affairs of the Hearth: Victorian Poetry and Domestic Narrative (1988), Representing the South Pacific: Colonial Discourse from Cook to Gauguin (1997), Leprosy and Empire: A Medical and Cultural History (2006), and Migrations: Journeys in Time and Place (2013).

Edmond lives in Deal with his partner Scarlett Thomas.
