= Flight: A Quantum Fiction Novel =

1995 novel by Vanna Bonta

- Book cover, paperback edition Flight: A Quantum Fiction Novel, by Vanna Bonta, 1996.
- Author: Vanna Bonta
- Cover artist: Corey Wolfe
- Language: English
- Genre: quantum fiction, magical realism, Paranormal romance, Urban fantasy, Conspiracy fiction, Adventure
- Publisher: Meridian House
- Publication date: 1995
- Publication place: United States
- Media type: Print (hardback & paperback); Audiobook
- Pages: 397
- ISBN: 978-0912339108
- Dewey Decimal: 813/.54
- Preceded by: "Rewards of Passion (Sheer Poetry)" (1981) "Shades of the World. Dora Books" (1985) "Degrees" (1989)

Flight: A Quantum Fiction Novel is a novel by American writer Vanna Bonta. First published in 1995, Flight is about Mendle J. Orion, a writer who notices that elements from the science fiction novel he is writing begin to manifest in the real world. Bonta claimed that she invented the term and the literary genre known as quantum fiction. The first line of the novel is "Which came first—the observer or the particle?"

== Setting ==
=== Overview ===
The novel takes place at the end of the 20th century and spans into the beginning of the 21st century. It utilizes an array of literary devices to highlight the illusory aspect of reality. The story is set primarily in Los Angeles, California, where Mendle Orion lives and works as a writer. Other cities are mentioned, such as San Diego, where Mendle attends the World Science Fiction Convention. The action ends on a farm in rural Kentucky.

=== Multiverse ===
A secondary plot takes place in other-world parallels to the main plot. This subplot presents as a novel-in-progress being written by the character Mendle Orion. The story's action is a multiverse.

=== Z Zone ===
A fictional universe called Z Zone (the "Sleep Zone") where individuals commit self-betrayal to escape being awake and functioning creatively is an allegory for the perils of mind control.

== Main characters ==
- Mendle Orion – A solitary writer who questions everything. He finds solace for his loneliness in his latest creation, a novel that stars an interdimensional traveler named Aira Flight, whom he endows with qualities that his superficial and manipulative girlfriend lacks.
- Aira Flight – (/ˈɛərə/ AIR-ə) The heroine of Mendle Orion's latest book. She is an interdimensional being who can shape shift and assume forms, or not, at will. 'Aira Flight' is also the name Mendle Orion gives a young woman he discovers in his hotel bathroom after it becomes obvious that she has no memory of her past. He believes she is a light being but she appears completely human, until the discovery that she has no navel heightens the mystery of the young woman's origin.
- Onx – A miniature dragon that travels with Aira Flight in the novel Mendle is writing. Mendle also assigns the name Onx to a stray white Samoyed dog he finds the night he meets the mysterious stranger he believes is Aira Flight come to life.
- Jorian – Aira Flight's true love in the novel Mendle is writing. In the beginning of Mendle's novel, Aira is searching for him after his strange disappearance.
- Sandra Wilford – Mendle's former girlfriend. She is a journalist, and is consumed by getting back with and saving Mendle, whom she believes is on the brink of losing his connection to reality.
- Dr. Alfred Kaufkiff – A psychoanalyst who offers services to sort out how people live their lives.
- Paul Toor | Loptoor – A government employee who bears an uncanny resemblance and name similarity to a cowardly character, Loptoor, in Mendle's novel.
- Lauryad – Aira Flight's spacecraft, which travels by manipulating space fabric.

== Plot summary ==
First edition hardcover Flight, 1995

A lonely science fiction writer, Mendle J. Orion, is disillusioned in the dystopic world of current event headlines. One stormy night, his life is forever changed when he finds a mysterious young woman with intense blue eyes in his hotel bathroom at a science fiction convention. The soulful stranger has no memory of any past before the moment of their meeting.

It's love at first sight as the writer notices the young woman's resemblance to the heroine in his new novel. He euphorically introduces her to his friends as "Aira Flight," the name of the dimension-traveling super heroine of his latest novel.

His friends are shocked and question Mendle's weird conviction and already dubious sanity. They become suspicious of the strange young woman who behaves as though she has no past. Orion's former girlfriend, the impeccably gorgeous Sandra Wilford, is especially concerned. Fueled by the desire to get Mendle back and save him from himself, she starts to investigate the disheveled woman's identity.

Mendle Orion transfers the love for the character in his novel, Aira Flight, to the blonde, wide-eyed stranger he takes home. The companionship he once found only in worlds of his creation are now his daily life. Orion is protective as Aira discovers urban life with the innocence of a newborn. Crime, war, and poverty appear unfamiliar to her. She experiences love, Nature, music, food, fashion with childlike wonder, as if seeing it all for the first time. Despite her mundane penchant for playing video games, Mendle's conviction about the young woman's unearthliness is sealed the day they go swimming with dolphins and, as she pulls off damp clothing, he discovers the mysterious stranger has no navel.

Even when sober, Orion notices the uncanny resemblance between the stranger and his descriptions of the superheroine in his book-in-progress. As he writes the chapters, particulars eerily coincide with real events throughout his day. Mendle becomes obsessed with synchronicity and the peculiar interplays of his fictional creations with reality.

Sandra Wilford's obsession with determining the real identity of "Aira Flight" escalates. She contacts an associate in the government, Paul Toor, and entices him with claims she knows an extraterrestrial. The two are finally successful in uncovering leads about Aira Flight's real identity. Sandra Wilford vindictively presents Mendle evidence that his “Dream Lover” is a mere mundane mortal: A driver's license identifying his mystical Aira Flight as a woman from Illinois. Sandra takes perverse pleasure in shattering the fantasy that was Mendle's solace.

Mendle insists it doesn't matter to him what the girl's real name or past is. He insists he knows her soul, and that he is in love. Just as Mendle begins to accept that the girl he named Aira Flight is probably a missing person somewhere, and in need of help, her memory begins to return in flashes — and when it does, the pieces are oddly straight out of the novel Mendle is writing.

Sandra places doubt in Mendle's mind that the girl may have read the work and could be a fan just playing into his fantasies, pretending to be Aira Flight. Aira swears to Mendle she has not read his notes or the novel-in-progress. She has no idea why and how the flashes of her past are straight out of the book Mendle Orion is writing.

As Mendle reviews his work for clues, the similarities between Paul Toor, Sandra’s government friend, and Lop Toor, a character in his novel who is Aira Flight's, strike him.

As the characters seek reasons to explain the spooky synchronicities, Sandra uncovers that the evidence Paul Toor produced about the "real identity" of the girl named Aira Flight is a fabricated phony ID. When Sandra sets out to find out why, she uncovers more than she ever imagined possible. As her cool composure unravels, the misfit Mendle Orion by contrast suddenly seems to have a handle on reality.

== Publishing history ==
Bonta attempted to find a traditional publisher for the novel, but was unsuccessful. She eventually accepted an offer for partnership in a boutique publishing agency staffed by a former Doubleday editor and film investor. Flight: a quantum fiction novel was published in hardcover in 1995.

In 2008, Bonta recorded an audiobook version of the novel, featuring herself as the narrator.

== Reception ==
Initial reviews were promising. Publishers Weekly wrote "Whatever 'quantum fiction' is, we need more of it." The American Library Association reviewed it as "auspicious" and "genre-bending." Bonta was invited to The Ricki Lake Show to discuss the novel and extraterrestrial life.

In 1996, the novel was presented by the commune of Florence, Italy's Camerata dei Poeti. Among the panel of presenters was Gabriella Fiori, a professor of Arts and Philosophy at the University of Padua and Italian biographer of Simone Weil. Fiori described Flight as "genius," "revolutionary," and "a masterpiece."
