= PopCo =

Book by Scarlett Thomas

- Author: Scarlett Thomas
- Language: English
- Genre: Novel
- Publisher: Harper Perennial
- Publication date: 2004
- Publication place: Great Britain
- Media type: Print
- Pages: 452 pp
- ISBN: 1-84115-764-3
- OCLC: 59355647

PopCo is a 2004 novel by British author Scarlett Thomas. The book addresses several mathematical topics.

== Plot ==
It tells a story of twenty-nine-year-old Alice Butler, a quirky, fiercely intelligent loner with an affinity for secret codes and mathematics. She works for the huge toy company named PopCo, where she creates snooping kids' kits - KidSpy, KidTec and KidCracker. At the company conference Alice and her colleagues are brought into developing the ultimate product for the teenage girls.

== Reception ==
The novel has been compared to Cryptonomicon by Neal Stephenson, with similarities including a buried treasure subplot and flashbacks to Bletchley Park.

A review in the journal of the American Mathematical Society praised its "subversive and lively style". A review in The Independent praised "the weight of ideas and downright chutzpah crammed into this book." Another review in The Independent described it as "a big, zeitgeisty novel that free-associates in the way that only cyberpunk science-fiction used to be able to do. It is such enormous fun, and so peppered with sharp observations and satirical jabs, that it gets away with editorialising patches [and] a certain hastiness of composition". A review in The Guardian described it as "awkward" but ultimately enjoyable.

However, another review in The Guardian found it "clumsy", writing "Thomas cannot decide whether she is writing a boarding-school adventure or a dystopic tale of global corporations." A review in the Daily Telegraph wrote "its adolescent earnestness and its morally fibrous manifesto can make for queasy reading."

PopCo was a 2004 book of the year in Time Out and The Independent on Sunday.
