= Wilson Harris =

Guyanese writer (1921–2018)

Sir Wilson Harris
- Harris in 1958
- Born: Theodore Wilson Harris; 24 March 1921; New Amsterdam, British Guiana (now New Amsterdam, Guyana)
- Died: 8 March 2018 (aged 96); Chelmsford, England
- Education: Queen's College
- Occupation: Writer
- Spouse(s): Cecily Carew (1945–ca. 1957); Margaret Whitaker (1959 until her death, January 2010)
- Children: with Cecily Carew: E. Nigel Harris, Alexis Harris, Denise Harris, Michael Harris
- Writing career
- Genres: Fiction, poetry, essay
- Notable awards: Guyana Prize for Literature (1987), Premio Mondello dei Cinque Continenti (1992), Guyana Prize for Literature (Special Award; 2002), Anisfield-Wolf Book Award (2014)

Sir Theodore Wilson Harris (24 March 1921 – 8 March 2018) was a Guyanese writer. He initially wrote poetry, but subsequently became a novelist and essayist. His writing style is often said to be abstract and densely metaphorical, and his subject matter wide-ranging. Harris is considered one of the most original and innovative voices in postwar literature in English. While he had a substantial impact on early post-colonial thought, his work is somewhat obscure today.

== Biography ==
Theodore Wilson Harris was born on 24 March 1921, in New Amsterdam in British Guiana, where his father worked at an insurance company. His parents were Theodore Wilson Harris and Millicent Josephine Glasford Harris. His birth father died, and his mother re-married; subsequently, his step-father, a surveyor, disappeared in the jungle. After studying at Queen's College in the capital of Guyana, Georgetown, Wilson Harris became a government surveyor in 1942, rising to senior surveyor in 1955 before taking up a career as lecturer and writer, and moving to England in 1959.

The knowledge of the savannahs and rain forests he gained during his twenty years as a land surveyor formed the setting for many of his books, with the Guyanese landscape dominating his fiction. The experience of the Guyanese interior also shaped his approach to fiction. He writes: "The impact of the forests and savannahs on those expeditions was to become of profound value in the language of the fictions I later wrote. My stepfather's disappearance in that immense interior when I was a child was the beginning of an involvement with the enigma of quests and journeys through visible into invisible worlds that become themselves slowly visible to require further penetration into other visible worlds without end or finality" ("An Autobiographical Essay," in Adler 2003: ix–x).

Between 1945 and 1961, Harris was a regular contributor of stories, poems and essays to Kyk-over-Al literary magazine and was part of a group of Guyanese intellectuals that included Martin Carter, Sidney Singh, Milton Williams, Jan Carew, A. J. Seymour, and Ivan Van Sertima. Harris later privately printed his poetic contributions to the magazine in the collection Eternity to Season (1954). Harris married his first wife Cecily Carew in 1945 (sister of famed Guyanese novelist Jan Carew). They had four children; the marriage dissolved around 1957.

Harris moved to England in 1959. That year, he met and married his second wife, Scottish poet and playwright Margaret Whitaker. They remained married for fifty years until her death in 2010. They never had children. She allowed Harris to sometimes quote her work in his epigraphs, and it seems clear that Harris drew a good deal of inspiration from Margaret's creative projects. The couple lived in the Holland Park area of London, England, until 1985, when they moved to the Essex countryside.

Harris published his first novel Palace of the Peacock in 1960 with Faber, approved for publication by then-editor in chief, T. S. Eliot. This became the first of a quartet of novels, The Guyana Quartet, which includes The Far Journey of Oudin (1961), The Whole Armour (1962), and The Secret Ladder (1963). He subsequently wrote the Carnival trilogy: Carnival (1985), The Infinite Rehearsal (1987), and The Four Banks of the River of Space (1990).

His most recent novels were Jonestown (1996), which tells of the mass-suicide of followers of cult leader Jim Jones, The Dark Jester (2001), a semi-autobiographical novel, The Mask of the Beggar (2003), and The Ghost of Memory (2006).

Harris also wrote non-fiction and critical essays and was awarded honorary doctorates by the University of the West Indies (1984) and the University of Liège (2001). He twice won the Guyana Prize for Literature.

A documentary on his work was produced for Channel 4's The Bandung File in the UK in 1985, directed by Colin Nutley, the first documentary of any kind to air on the show.

Harris was dubbed a Knight Bachelor in Queen Elizabeth II's 2010 Birthday Honours. In 2014, Harris won a Lifetime Achievement Prize from the Anisfield-Wolf Book Awards.

== Criticism ==
Louis Chude-Sokei argues that the readerly "consensus is that Harris's irrecuperability and his minor or cult status is largely due to his prose... its complexity and density, whether fiction or non-fiction, regularly ban him from course syllabi and the rituals of literary culture, even in the Caribbean." At the same time, perhaps partly because of the challenge of Harris's work, "his legacy can and should make a difference" to Caribbean art and thought (ibid). Harris has been admired for his exploration of the themes of conquest and colonization as well as the struggles of colonized peoples. Readers have commented that his novels are an attempt to express truths about the way people experience reality through the lens of the imagination. Harris has been faulted for his novels that have often nonlinear plot lines, and for his preference of internal perceptions over external realities. In Palace of the Peacock (1960), a character who may be depicted as dying in one scene may return fully alive in the next; indeed, in the world of the novel, Donne and his entire ship crew are already dead, or perhaps simply bear the identical names of a previous crew: "their living names matched the names of a famous dead crew that had sunk in the rapids and been drowned to a man" (36).

Critics have described Harris's abstract, experimental narratives as difficult to read, dense, complex, or opaque. Many readers have commented that his essays push the boundaries of traditional literary criticism, and that his fiction pushes the limits of the novel genre itself. Harris's writing has been associated with many different literary genres by critics, including: surrealism, magic realism, mysticism and modernism. Over the years, Harris has used many different concepts to define his literary approach, including: cross-culturalism, modern allegory, epic, and quantum fiction. One critic described Harris's fictions as informed by "quantum penetration where Existence and non-existence are both real. You can contemplate them as if both are true." [who?]

Hena Maes-Jelinek has argued that before 1982, many of Harris's women characters were restricted to muse and mother roles. Joyce Sparer Adler agrees, but notes that certain novels had stronger characters with more narrative agency, such as Beti in The Far Journey of Oudin (1961) and Magda in The Whole Armour (1962). However, it is not until Susan Forrestal in The Waiting Room (1967) that Harris writes a woman protagonist, though she does play a muse-like capacity for the spirit antagonist figure representing her dead lover; and it is not until Prudence in Tumatumari (1968) that we see a fully-fleshed out character with emotional depth. Adler also notes that Carnival (1985) features major woman characters such as Aunt Bartelby and Amaryllis. As such, these two books represent significant developments; Adler points to a more androgynous vision of consciousness portrayed in the two, particularly Carnival (1985). In an interview with Kate Webb, Angela Carter however deepens the critical conversation by arguing that all of Harris's characters are archetypal; so any critique about flatness leveled against woman characters would also apply to the men. For Adler, Harris used the cipher of fictional character in the same way ritual uses masks; they are portals between worlds, and assemblages of mythological history, not really depictions of people. As such, the notion of expecting realist novels' character construction in Harris is, on its face, quixotic and antithetical to his project.

In his introduction to Tradition, the Writer, and Society (1967), C. L. R. James writes of a dialectical impulse at work in Harris's fiction and theory, linking Harris to Hegel and Heidegger. However, later critical work such as by Hena Maes-Jelinek, Paget Henry and Andrew Bundy argued that Harris was instead drawing on aesthetic resources of syncretism of African and Amerindigenous systems of belief and practice. Harris himself wrote in History, Fable & Myth in the Caribbean & Guianas (1970) that his work "reads back through the shock of place and time for omens of capacity that were latent, unrealized, within the clash of cultures and movements of peoples into the South Americas and West Indies”. Harris does not necessarily need to rely on a Hegelian historical theory, since he feels that a philosophy of history in fact lies within Caribbean arts (ibid). As much as James's materialist historical approach is an indelible influence on the Caribbean, modern criticism on Harris argues that the importance of the materialist approach cannot overshadow other Caribbean philosophies of history, such as presented by Harris. Paget Henry places Wilson Harris in the "mythopoetic tradition" of Caribbean thought in his foundational Caliban's reason (2000).

== Literary technique ==
The technique of Harris has been called experimental and innovative. Harris describes that conventional writing is different from his style of writing in that "conventional writing is straightforward writing" and "My writing is quantum writing. Do you know of the quantum bullet? The quantum bullet, when it's fired, leaves not one hole but two."

From the beginning of his literary output, Harris foregrounded the agency of nature and the intersection of Caribbean myth with the epic form. Mikhail Bakhtin categorized "the epic as a genre that has come down to us already well defined and real. We come upon it when it is almost completely finished," and the novel as unfinished and becoming; Harris, however, frames the transformative quality of the inheritance of epic, rather than define it along genre lines, writing that epic is "an arrival in multidimensionality that alerts us to some kind of transfiguration of appearances—in parallel with science and architecture—that implies energies akin to extra-human faculties inserted into the fabric of history.” The kernel of epic is this capacity to transfigure appearances, and Harris wanted to imbue his sentences with this mystical capacity. In The Long Space: Transnationalism and Postcolonial Form, Peter Hitchcock argues that "Harris writes epics as novels".

The use of nonlinear events and metaphor is a substantive component of Harris's prose. Another technique employed by Harris is the combination of words and concepts in unexpected, jarring ways, often in the paradoxical yoking of opposites (hence C. L. R. James's analysis of Harris's prose as dialectical). Through this technique of combination, Harris displays the underlying, linking root that prevents two categories from ever really existing in opposition. The technique exposes and alters the power of language to lock in fixed beliefs and attitudes, "freeing" words and concepts to associate in new ways and revealing the alchemic aspects of consciousness. For Harris, the task is to experiment with the capacities of language so that it can measure it to the complexity of reality, hence his general distrust of and disappointment with literary realism.

Harris sees language as the key to social and human transformations. His approach begins with a regard of language as a power to both enslave and free. This quest and understanding underlies his narrative fiction themes about human slavery, colonization, power, freedom, and mystical or ecstatic experiences. Harris cites language as both a crucial element in the subjugation of enslaved and indentured people, and the means by which the destructive processes of history could be reversed.

In Palace of the Peacock, Harris seeks to expose the illusion of opposites that create enmities between peoples and cultures. A crew on a river expedition experiences a series of tragedies that ultimately bring about each member's death. Along the way, Harris highlights as prime factor in their demise their inability to reconcile binaries in the world around them and between each other. With his technique of binary breakdowns, and echoing the African tradition of death not bringing the end to a soul, Harris demonstrates that they find reconciliation and mystical liberation from bias only in physical death, pointing out the superficiality of illusions of opposites that separated them and situating death as a new life.

Harris noted in an interview that "in describing the world you see, the language evolves and begins to encompass realities that are not visible". Harris attributed his innovative literary techniques as a development that was the result of being witness to the physical world behaving as quantum theory. To accommodate his new perceptions, Harris said he realized he was writing "quantum fiction". The "quantum" component of his work is his attempt to measure up to the demand of reality itself, deeply influenced by his two decades as a land surveyor of the Guyanese interior. Of the connection between nature and his literary style, Harris wrote:

"The table comes from a tree in the forest, the forest is the lungs of the globe, and the lungs of the globe breathe on the stars. There are all sorts of connections and those are quantum connections. Quantum mechanics and physics would embrace those connections. At that stage I had read nothing of quantum mechanics and I simply addressed my repudiation of absolute chains upon nature (my repudiation of a nature there to serve me, to prop up my structures) as an intuitive disturbing necessity. I needed to immerse myself in the living, disturbing, but immensely rich text of landscapes/riverscapes/skyscapes. Language began to break its contract with mere tools framed to enshrine a progressive deprivation. There was a more complex and intuitive approach to language in which one suffers and through which one perceives the peculiar ecstasies of dimensionality." (Harris, "The Fabric of the Imagination" A 72)

His writing has been called ambitiously experimental and his narrative structure is described as "multiple and flexible". Common metafiction framing techniques in his novels include dreams and dreams within dreams (as in the Guyana Quartet (1985) and The Dark Jester (2001)), tropes from epic poetry, found or received archival material (such as the asylum journals analysed by the narrator in The Waiting Room (1966) or The Angel at the Gate(1982), or the papers of Idiot Nameless in Companions of the Day and Night (1975)), and the repeated use of the same characters across different novel-universes (such as the da Silva twins from Palace, who reappear throughout the oeuvre, for example in Da Silva Da Silva's Cultivated Wilderness (1977)).

Harris categorized his innovations and literary techniques as quantum fiction. In a July 2010 interview with Michael Gilkes, he said: "I came to the idea of a quantum reality through the kind of landscape I was dealing with. You had trees, rivers, cliffs, human beings, waterfalls and you had various opposites in them. There were opposites in the land, in the rivers, in the waterfalls, and in order to write about this I had to find a method which I later discovered was a quantum reality. At the time when I wrote Palace I knew nothing of quantum physics. Later on I used the idea consciously, since I had already opened myself to it. It runs through all my novels." He uses the definition in The Carnival Trilogy and in the final novel, The Four Banks of the River of Space.

With respect to the writing process, Harris seemed to engage in an extensive cycle of re-writing, and an open format that allows for the incorporation into the novel of a variety of materials. This approach aligns him well with literary movements in the Caribbean that draw on cyclical re-writing and incorporation of many literary genres, including Haitian spiralism, and situates him, more generally, in an experimental literary space. More research should be done with primary sources such as Harris's notebooks and manuscripts to trace how phrases and sentences evolve across cycles of re-writing, and how the sentence-level writing process interacts with the larger-scale narrative considerations and techniques.

== Death and legacy ==
Harris died on 8 March 2018, at his home in Chelmsford, England, of natural causes. The centenary of his birth was celebrated by the Bocas Lit Fest. A portion of Harris's personal library is preserved in the Rare Books Department at Cambridge University Library, at the shelfmark CCA-E.80. The Harry Ransom Center at the University of Texas Austin houses a significant collection of Harris's manuscript archive and correspondence archive, Manuscript Collection MS-01848.

Harris is the foremost mythopoetic writer of the Caribbean. While his work has fallen into a degree of obscurity, his influence and importance can't be overstated. After Edgar Mittelholzer, Harris was the second Caribbean writer to successfully make a living from his words.

== Works ==
=== Novels ===
(All published by Faber and Faber)

- 1960: Palace of the Peacock
- 1961: The Far Journey of Oudin
- 1962: The Whole Armour
- 1963: The Secret Ladder
- 1964: Heartland
- 1965: The Eye of the Scarecrow
- 1966: The Waiting Room
- 1967: Tumatumari
- 1968: Ascent to Omai
- 1969: The Sleepers of Roraima (illustrated by Kay Usborne)
- 1971: The Age of the Rainmakers (illustrated by Kay Usborne)
- 1972: Black Marsden: A Tabula Rasa Comedy
- 1975: Companions of the Day and Night
- 1977: Da Silva da Silva's Cultivated Wilderness/Genesis of the Clowns
- 1978: The Tree of the Sun
- 1982: The Angel at the Gate
- 1985: Carnival
- 1985: The Guyana Quartet (Palace of the Peacock, The Far Journey of Oudin,The Whole Armour, The Secret Ladder)
- 1987: The Infinite Rehearsal
- 1990: The Four Banks of the River of Space
- 1993: Resurrection at Sorrow Hill
- 1993: The Carnival Trilogy (Carnival, The Infinite Rehearsal, The Four Banks of the River of Space), 1993
- 1996: Jonestown
- 2001: The Dark Jester
- 2003: The Mask of the Beggar
- 2006: The Ghost of Memory

=== Short stories ===
- Kanaima, 1964
- The Sleepers of Roraima, 1970
- The Age of the Rainmakers, 1971

=== Poetry ===
- Fetish, 1951
- The Well and the Land, 1952
- Eternity to Season, 1954

=== Nonfiction ===
- 1967: Tradition, the Writer and Society: Critical Essays. London: New Beacon Books.
- 1970: History, Fable and Myth in the Caribbean and Guianas. Georgetown: National History and Arts Council.
- 1974: Fossil and Psyche. Austin: University of Texas.
- 1981: Explorations: A Selection of Talks and Articles 1966– 1981. Aarhus: Dangaroo Press.
- 1983: The Womb of Space: The Cross-Cultural Imagination. Westport: Greenwood Press.
- 1992: The Radical Imagination: Lectures and Talks. Liège: L3.
- 1999: The Unfinished Genesis of the Imagination: Selected Essays of Wilson Harris. London: Routledge.

== Prizes and awards ==
- 1987: Guyana Prize for Literature
- 1992: Premio Mondello dei Cinque Continenti
- 2002: Guyana Prize for Literature (Special Award)
- 2008: The Nicolas Guillen Philosophical Literature Prize, Caribbean Philosophical Association
- 2014: Anisfield-Wolf Book Award
