= Vanna Bonta =

Italian-American writer and poet (1953–2014)

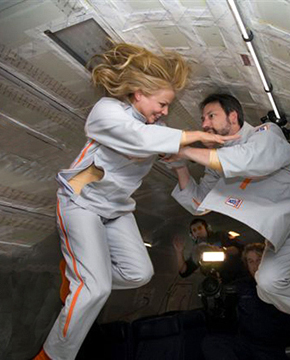
- Bonta (left) with her husband Allen Newcomb in 2008
- Born: April 3, 1953; Clarksville, Tennessee, US
- Died: July 8, 2014 (aged 61)
- Occupations: Writer and poet
- Relatives: Luigi Ugolini (grandfather)
- Writing career
- Language: English, Italian
- Genres: Fiction and poetry
- Notable work: Flight: A Quantum Fiction Novel
- Movement: Quantum fiction

Vanna Marie Bonta (April 3, 1953 – July 8, 2014) was an American writer and actress. She wrote Flight: A Quantum Fiction Novel, which is associated with the quantum fiction genre.

Bonta invented the 2suit, a flight garment designed to facilitate sex in microgravity environments of outerspace. In 2009, the spacesuit was featured on The Universe television series, which followed Bonta into zero gravity to film an episode titled "Sex in Space".

== Early life and family ==
Bonta was born on April 3, 1953, in Clarksville, Tennessee, United States. Her parents were Maria Luisa Ugolini Bonta (née Ugolini), a painter from Florence, Italy, and James Cecil Bonta, a military officer from Kentucky. Her grandfather was Luigi Ugolini, a Florentine writer and poet. Her maternal aunt was Italian children's author Lidia Ugolini.

== Writing and acting career ==
As an actress, Bonta acted in the 1982 television series The Beastmaster and had voice roles in television and feature films such as Disney's Beauty and the Beast.

In 1995, Bonta's first novel, Flight: A Quantum Fiction Novel was published. Flight has been characterized as "inter-genre" (belonging to more than one genre simultaneously) by the American Library Association, which reviewed it an "auspicious, genre-bending parable". Publishers Weekly described the debut work as running the gamut of particularly moving to quirky and hilarious satire, with "asides about bathtub books, self-doubt tapes and other foibles." Associated with the quantum fiction genre, Bonta claimed to have coined the term when she published the novel.

In 2013, a haiku Bonta wrote was one of over 1100 that was launched to Mars on the NASA spacecraft MAVEN. The haiku for the Mars trip were chosen by popular vote from a total 12,530 submissions. Bonta's submission was ranked in the top five.

== Inventions ==
=== The 2suit ===
In 2006, Bonta gave talks about an invention she called the 2suit, a flight garment that can be attached to another 2suit to allow two or more people to stay in proximity to one another in low-gravity environments. Although it had several other potential applications, its primary purpose was to enable sex in space. Producers of the History Channel television series The Universe approached Bonta in 2008, offering to manufacture a prototype of the 2suit and send Bonta into zero gravity to test it. She accepted. On the 2suit's segment of the episode, Bonta and her husband demonstrated how the suit works by kissing while wearing it. The documentary concluded that the "2Suit is one small step for humankind colonizing the universe." The 2suit received significant media attention after the episode, titled "Sex in Space", aired in 2009.

=== Lunar Lander Challenge ===
From 2007 to 2009, Bonta participated in the annual Lunar Lander Challenge, a competition sponsored by NASA and Northrop Grumman to commercially build a lightweight spacecraft for landing on the Moon. As creative director of her team BonNova, she designed a pressure-release device for high-combustion engines.

== Selected bibliography ==
- Bonta, Vanna (1981). Rewards of Passion (Sheer Poetry). Empire Books.
- — (1985). Shades of the World. Dora Books.
- — (1989). Degrees – Thought Capsules (Poems) and Micro Tales on Life, Death, Man, Woman, & Art. Dora Books.
- — (1995). Flight: A Quantum Fiction Novel. Meridian House.
