= Palace of the Peacock =

1960 novel by Wilson Harris

- First edition
- Author: Wilson Harris
- Language: English
- Genre: Historiographic metafiction, Magical realism
- Publisher: Faber & Faber
- Publication date: 1960
- Publication place: United Kingdom
- Media type: Print (hardcover, paperback)
- Followed by: The Far Journey of Oudin (1961)

Palace of the Peacock is the 1960 debut novel by Guyanese writer Wilson Harris. It is considered an important early postcolonial novel and a canonical text in Caribbean literary studies. The novel is the first in Harris's "Guyana Quartet" of novels, which also include The Far Journey of Oudin (1961), The Whole Armour (1962) and The Secret Ladder (1963).

== Synopsis ==
The novel presents the narrative of a group of men from different ethnic backgrounds making their way up a dangerous and turbulent river within the jungles of Guyana. The party is led by a man named Donne, a cruel second-generation European colonialist who was born in Guyana, and who is hunting for a woman called Mariella who has run away from him. Over the course of the journey it becomes apparent that it is not the first time the men have tried to make their way up this river and that last time they attempted to traverse the river they were all drowned. It is suggested that they now exist in a liminal or spectral state between life and death. The events of the narrative are narrated by a first person narrator who is identified simply as "Dreamer" in the opening pages of the novel. Dreamer's presence becomes increasingly oblique as the novel progresses.

== Publication ==
The novel was written in 1959 after Wilson Harris had moved to London from Guyana. The manuscript for the novel was accepted for publication by T. S. Eliot.
