= Luigi Ugolini =

Italian writer (1891–1980)

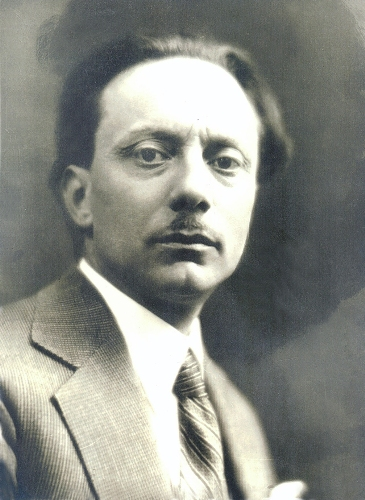
- Luigi Ugolini
- Born: 25 June 1891; Florence, Italy
- Died: 22 June 1980 (aged 88); Florence, Italy
- Occupations: Writer, essayist, poet, painter
- Spouse: Lina Vaselli
- Children: 7, including Lydia Ugolini and Maria Luisa
- Relatives: Vanna Bonta (granddaughter)
- Writing career
- Pen name: Giulio D'Albenga
- Period: 1940–1980
- Genres: Novelized Biography; Fiction; Historical Fiction; Fantasy/SF; Young Adult
- Notable awards: Premio Castello 1962. Premio Bancerello Sport 1983

Luigi Ugolini (25 June 1891 – 22 June 1980) was an Italian writer. He is best known for his series of fictionalized biographies of Italian leaders in art and science, and for a volume of work that immortalizes traditions, values and ways of life of Tuscany and Florence. Ugolini left an early career as a lawyer to write, and his literary works, many of which are inducted as scholastic required reading in Italian schools, earned a worldwide reputation and several prestigious literary awards. He was also a painter, an expert ornithologist and gastronome.

== Biography ==
Luigi Ugolini descended from a noble family of Tuscany whose recorded lineage dates back to 1585 in Arezzo, Italy. Ugolini was born in Florence, where his Siena-born father and his grandfather both had medical practices. Ugolini was a nobleman who was known to prefer the company of poor farmers in the regions of Maremma, whom he described as truer gentlemen than many of those so-called gentlemen in the city. Accounts depict Ugolini as playful as he was honestly outspoken. He married Lina Vaselli, and the couple had seven children, four sons and three daughters.

Ugolini attended the Military Academy of Modena and graduated from the University of Pisa with a degree in Law, mainly to honor his father's wishes. After 10 years of practicing law, he made a dramatic move to devote his life to his calling of letters. He was introduced by Giovanni Papini in Nuova Antologia the leading Italian literary magazine (New Anthology). Ugolini's novels document and give voice to the nearly invisible Tuscan way of life, now absorbed into near nonexistence by a modernized and globalized Italy. For example, in his story of the fearless Domenico Tirbuzi, a Florentine Robin Hood of the poor masses, Ugolini preserves the dialogue, Tuscan dialect, and archaic words particular to the Maremma vernacular. Ugolini's The Story of My Land immortalizes bread making, cooking and many details of classic country life in a now changing Tuscany.

Ugolini was godfather to his granddaughter, the novelist/poet Vanna Bonta. He named her Vanna after the female character in Dante Alighieri's "La Vita Nuova." Lydia Ugolini, Ugolini's eldest daughter and a popular children's writer, returned to the Ugolini home after becoming widowed in 1964. She was appointed by Ugolini as executrix of his literary and personal estate in 1972, and later named to that position by Ugolini's last will and testament. She worked with her father and cared for him until his death in 1980. In his will, Ugolini left half of his estate to Lydia Ugolini, the maximum allowable to a testator by Italian law, and the remainder was divided among his other living children and descendants.

Ugolini and his wife were married over sixty years at the time of her death in 1975. He died at home in Florence. His body is interred in the Porte Sante (Holy Doors) cemetery at the Basilica di San Miniato al Monte, Florence. On his death bed, Ugolini told his daughter Lydia that he had always been true to his wife, her mother, and was still in love with her. He added that she was the only woman he had loved and that he would marry her again. His last murmured words were, "Una pagina bianca" (literally "a white page" but meaning "a blank page" or "a new page").

== Literary career ==
Ugolini wrote fiction and novelized historical biographies for adults and young readers, many of which are required reading in Italian schools. In all, he published over 120 works, including technical manuals, radio dramas, scholastic texts, handbooks, cookbooks, and scientific essays.

In 1916, Luigi Ugolini published Ex Corde, a collection of poems with themes about Nature, eternal war, and humanity. He was living as a second lieutenant after his graduation from the Military Academy of Modena and embarked in a law career for ten years, but this volume first publicly revealed Ugolini a poet. The book of the then-unknown author earned high praise in La Nazione reviews by noted writers of that epoch that included Grazia Deledda and Giovanni Marradi.

Ugolini was featured in many publications. He also contributed as a journalist to leading Italian newspapers, among them La Nazione and Messaggero. Following the review of an early work, The New York Times Book Review (3 June 1934) stated: "an extremely interesting biography of the one notorious brigand of the Maremma, Tiburzi, from the pen of Luigi Ugolini, painter and hunter, whose Il nido di Falasco (1932) first attracted attention to his possibilities as a man of letters. Ugolini will bear watching."

After World War II, Ugolini concentrated on literary work for youths, creating the famous series of "Novelized Biographies" for the Paravia, Società Editrice Internazionale (SEI), and Minerva Italica publishing houses.

In 1983, Ugolini's "Tales of Hunting, Fishing, Life" ("Olimpia di Vallecchi") posthumously earned Italy's Prize of Bancerello Sport.

=== Translations ===
The Austrian Ministry of Education acknowledged Ugolini in the noted publication "Jugendbuch Autoren aus allen Welt," edited by Lucia Binder for Italy. Ugolini's works have been translated into Japanese and most European languages (German, Romanian, Czech, Hungarian, Portuguese, Serb-Croatian, Spanish) and have won numerous literary prizes.

=== National monument ===
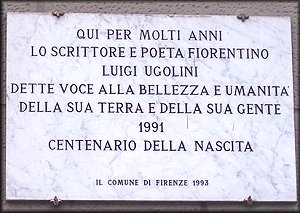
Memorial plaque in Florence by the municipal authorities.

On 11 December 1993 the Commune of Florence affixed a commemorative marble plaque to the Ugolini home in Florence, declaring the house a national monument. The epigraph on the plaque was unveiled during a government dedication ceremony in which some officials wore Renaissance-period clothing styles. In English, the epigraph reads, "Here for many years the Florentine writer and poet Luigi Ugolini gave voice to the beauty and humanity of his land and his people."

Throughout his life, Ugolini referred to himself as an Etruscan, as did his publishers. In a preface About Luigi Ugolini (1965), his publisher, Paravia, added the comment: “His work adheres to its spirit and its inspiration, to the ancient region that always gave, by particular grace, the most iconic figures of art and science. Because his work has, of the Maremma region, the ancient mysterious spell, like the luminous Florentine hills and the deep silences of Volterra.”

== Political activity ==
Known as a poet whose writings were a flame to conscience and ethical thinking, Ugolini is remembered as a brave spirit who considered indifference among the most reprehensible of sins. On 27 April 1940 Ugolini was arrested by the Fascist police for his essays against the regime. When Benito Mussolini's political movement began to establish alliances with Germany, Ugolini protested and predicted the misfortune of entering World War II in alliance with Adolf Hitler. He was tried and condemned by the Special Court to two years of confinement as a political prisoner.

Legends of Ugolini are still told in smaller towns of the Tuscan countryside. He is said to have packed his seven children into a car after a dishonest business manager lost their country villa, and to have lit a cigarette with a piece of money to show disdain for greed. Another legend tells of his arrest by the Fascist police. According to this legend, his daughter Maria Luisa went to the garden to announce to her father they had visitors, two men who claimed to be from Cinecittà. When Ugolini asked his daughter for her impression of them, she gave him the hand signal for "so-so." Ugolini quietly instructed her to hide his typewriter. The two men in fact were Fascist police in disguise, and they arrested him. After interrogation and threats against his family, Ugolini admitted being the anonymous author of the anti-Fascist essays. Ugolini asked for copies of the essays in question, a pen, and a cigarette, and then he signed his name to each essay. He was spared execution because Mussolini admired his novel La Zolla and saw that the public opinion of Ugolini was too favorable.

== Awards and honors ==
- Premio Nazionale Città di Biella, 1935, for La Zolla
- Premio dell'Accademia d'Italia (Accademia dei Lincei), 1936, for The Skua of White Island (Societa Editrice Internazionale)
- Premio Castello, 1962, for The Skua of White Island (Societa Editrice Internazionale)
- Premio Bancerello Sport, 1983, for Tales of Hunting, Fishing, Life (Olimpia)

== Bibliography ==
=== Novelized biographies ===
- The Story of Beato Angelico (Il romanzo di Beato Angelico) (Paravia)
- The Story of Benvenuto Cellini (Il romanzo di Benvenuto Cellini) (Paravia)
- The Story of Brunelleschi (Il romanzo di Brunelleschi), 1953 (Paravia)
- The Story of Caravaggio (Il romanzo del Caravaggio), 1954
- The Story of Dante (Il romanzo di Dante)
- The Story of Monk Diavolo (Il romanzo di fra Diavolo), 1969
- The Story of Brother Sun (Il romanzo di frate sole)
- The Story of Galileo (Il romanzo di Galileo), 1959, 1998 (Le Monnier)
- The Story of Garibaldi (Il romanzo di Garibaldi), 1958 (Paravia)
- The Story of Goldoni (Il romanzo di Goldoni) illustr. by Luigi Togliatto, 1954 (Paravia)
- The Story of Julius Caesar (Il romanzo di Giulio Cesare)
- The Story of Leonardo (Il romanzo di Leonardo), 1950 (G. B. Paravia)
- The Story of Lodovico Ariosto (Il romanzo di Lodovico Ariosto), 1965 (Paravia)
- The Story of Michelangelo
- The Story of Napoleon (Il romanzo di Napoleone), 1957 (Paravia)
- The Story of Niccolò Machiavelli (Il romanzo di Niccolò Machiavelli), 1973 (Paravia)
- Paul VI, (Paolo 6), 1969 (Società Editrice Internazionale)
- The Story of Messier Petrarc (Il romanzo di Messier Petrarca) (Paravia)
- The Story of Raffaello
- The Story of Savonarola (Il romanzo di Savonarola) (Paravia)
- The Story of Virgil (Il romanzo di Virgilio), 1951, (Paravia)
- The Story of Titian (Il romanzo di Tiziano)
- The Story of Vespucci (Il romanzo di Vespucci)
- The Story of Hannibal (Il romanzo di Annibale) illustr. by Marcello Vettor, 1962
- The Story of Ulysses (Minerva)
- The Story of Ugo Foscolo (Il romanzo di Ugo Foscolo) (Paravia)

=== Poetry ===
- Ex Corde 1916

=== Anthologies ===
- Fiordelverde – Antologia Italiana (Italian anthology for Middle Schools), 1951 (Paravia) Editor and Contributor

=== Novels into film ===
- Giuliano de' Medici (1941)
- Musoduro (1953)
- Nido di Falasco II (1950)

=== Radio drama ===
- Seventy-seven Larks and a Husband (Settantasette lodole e un marito), 1934

=== Fiction, youth, and scholastic required reading ===
- The Story of "Him" (Il romanzo di "lui")
- The Sod (La Zolla)
- Wildlife Adventures (Storie di vita selvaggia), 1931
- The Nest of Falasco (Il nido di falasco), (Vallecchi, 1932) (Olimpia, 2001)
- Domenico Tiburzi, Old Maremma (Domenico Tiburzi, vecchia maremma), 1933 (Vallecchi)
- Birds of Italy (Reference book) (Dizionario dialettale italiano degli uccelli d'Italia : con 12160 voci dialettali e corrispondenti italiane) (Editor), 1938 Diana
- Island of the Birds (L'isola degli uccelli), 1934
- Submerged Land (Terra Sommersa Nuova Antologia), 1935, introduction by Giovanni Papini
- A Boy and 1000 Creatures (Un Ragazzo e Mille Bestie)
- Florence Lives (Firenze Viva), illustr. by Luciano Guarnieri, 1954 (Società Editrice Internazionale), 1979 (Longanesi)
- Musoduro – Memoirs of a Poacher (Musoduro, Memorie di un Bracconiere), 1936 (Olimpia)
- Around the World with Magellan (Con Magellano Intorno al Mondo), 1952 (Società Editrice Internazionale)
- With Marco Polo in the Court of Kublai Khan (Con Marco Polo alla Corte del Gran Kan), illustr. by R. Sgrilli, (Società Editrice Internazionale)
- Cavalry and Army, The Heroic Empress (prose narrative) ("Cavalieri e l'Armi", Le Eroiche Impresse dell'Orlando Furioso)
- Son of Dante (Il Figlio di Dante) (historical novel), 1944, illustr. by A. Craffonara (Società Editrice Internazionale)
- The Condottieri of Italy (I Condottieri D'Italia), 1944 (Principato)
- King of Gypsies (Il Re degli Zingari) Illustr. by D. Natoli, 1964
- When I Met God (Quando m'Incontrai Con Dio)
- Pinocchio 2 (sequel) (Il Seguito di Pinocchio), Illustr. R. Sgrilli (Società Editrice Internazionale)
- The City of Fire (adventure thriller) (La città del fuoco), Illustr. by E. Dell'Acqua (Società Editrice Internazionale)
- "The Wolf" – Stories of Fishing and Hunting (La lupa – Novelle di pesca e di caccia per tutti), Illustr. D. Natoli (Società Editrice Internazionale)
- The Little House (youth fiction) (La Piccola Casa ), 1951, Illustr. by R. Sgrilli (Società Editrice Internazionale)
- The Island Never Found (adventure thriller) (L'isola non-Trovata – Avventure del Mozzo Ramon), Illustr. L.Togliatto (Società Editrice Internazionale)
- Youth of Maremma (Tuscan novellas) (Ragazzi di Maremma. Novelle toscane), 1940, illustr. by R. Sgrilli (Società Editrice Internazionale)
- We Navigate to the Orient (historical fiction) (Si naviga ad Oriente), illustr. by A. Craffonara (SEI)
- Sotto le insegne del Ferruccio (romanzo storico), illustr. by F. Chiletto
- A Boy and 1000 Creatures in Four Dimensions of Earth (Un Ragazzo e Mille Bestie in Quattro Palmi di Terra), 1951, illustr. by A.M. Nardi (Società Editrice Internazionale)
- The Castle of Dreams (Il Castello dei Sogni), 1952, illustr. by Piquillo (Società Editrice Internazionale)
- Pa of the Caverns (Pa delle caverne), 1956 (Società Editrice Internazionale)
- A Man Alone in the Forest, a story for kids of 12 to 80 (Un Uomo Solo nel Bosco, racconto per ragazzi dai 12 agli 80 anni) illustrazioni del pittore Natoli) (illustr. by D. Natoli) (Società Editrice Internazionale)
- Toward a New World – The Story of Amerigo Vespucci (Verso un Nuovo Mondo. Il Romanzo di Amerigo Vespucci), illustr. by C. Monasterolo (Società Editrice Internazionale)
- Voices of the Sea and the Land (narrative prose) (Voci del Mare e della Terra), 1953 (Società Editrice Internazionale)
- The Story of My Land (Il romanzo della mia terra), cover by Pietro Annigoni, 1946, 1966 (Paravia)
- Diana's Realm: Story of the Hunt Over Centuries (Il regno di Diana: storia della caccia attraverso i secoli), 1954 (Società Editrice Internazionale)
- The Poet of Sorrento Torquato Tasso (Il Poeta di Sorrento), 1995 (Società Editrice Internazionale)
- The Skua of White Island (Gli Skua d'Isola Bianca), 1961 (Collana L'Aquilone)
- With You, Father (Con Te, Babbo), 1967 (Paravia)
- Those Days... (Quei giorni...), 1967
- Breakfast, Lunch and Dinner (Tuscan cookbook) – (Colazione Pranzo e Cena), 1969 (Casa Editrice Ceschina)
- Regina Coeli – Ten Months of Fascist Jail, (Regina coeli – dieci mesi di carcere fascista), 1970, (Casa Editrice Ceschina)
- Life Blooms in a Garden (La Vita Sboccia in un Giardino), 1970 (Centauri)
- Tales of Hunting, Fishing and Life (Racconti di caccia, di pesca, di vita), 1982 (Olimpia)
- Stories of the Hunt in Marsh and Hill (Storie di Caccia in Palude e in Collina), 2005 (Olimpia)
