= The End of Mr. Y =

2006 novel by Scarlett Thomas

- First edition (US)
- Author: Scarlett Thomas
- Language: English
- Genre: Novel
- Publisher: Harcourt Books (US); Canongate Books (UK)
- Publication date: 2006
- Publication place: United Kingdom
- Media type: Print
- Pages: 416 pp
- ISBN: 0-15-603161-2
- OCLC: 64065900
- Dewey Decimal: 823/.92 22
- LC Class: PR6120.H66 E53 2006

The End of Mr. Y is a novel by British author Scarlett Thomas. The book tells the story of Ariel Manto, a PhD student who has been researching the 19th century writer Thomas Lumas. She finds an extremely rare copy of Lumas' novel The End of Mr. Y in a second-hand bookshop. The book is rumoured to be cursed - everyone who has read it has died not long afterwards.

Central to Lumas' book is the "Troposphere" – a place where all consciousness is connected and you can enter other people's minds and read their thoughts. The book contains the recipe for a homeopathic formula that Lumas' hero uses to enter the Troposphere. Manto uses the recipe to reproduce the formula and subsequently enters the Troposphere herself. She soon discovers that there are other people who know about the Troposphere, and intend to keep it a secret, even if that means killing her.

The book mentions that her surname is fictitious and based on an anagram; Ariel Manto is an anagram of I am not real.

As have Janette Turner Hospital and Andrew Crumey, the writer explores the relationships between quantum physics and post-modernist and deconstructionist theory. The description of the Troposphere has been compared to the novels of Neal Stephenson and William Gibson, and shares similarities to The Matrix. It was long-listed for the Orange Prize for Fiction in 2008, sold 150,000 copies, and won a Nibbie award for best cover.
