= Hena Maes-Jelinek =

Hena Maes-Jelinek (1929 – 8 July 2008) was a Czech-born Belgian literary scholar. She has been called "one of the founding mothers of the study of Commonwealth Literature and, later, Postcolonial studies in Europe", who "pioneered the study of Caribbean literature in Belgium and Europe". She wrote extensively on the Guyanese writer Wilson Harris.

Tribute was paid to her in a collection entitled The Cross-Cultural Legacy: Critical and Creative Writings in Memory of Hena Maes-Jelinek (edited by Gordon Collier, Geoffrey V. Davis, Marc Delrez and Bénédicte Ledent; Brill, 2016), with contributors including Alastair Niven, Fred D'Aguiar, Wilson Harris, Louis James, Karen King-Aribisala, Alecia McKenzie, Caryl Phillips, Lawrence Scott, Stephanos Stephanides and Janet Wilson, and many others.

== Works ==
- Criticism of Society in the English Novel between the Wars, 1971
- The Naked Design, 1976
- Wilson Harris, 1982
- (ed.) Wilson Harris: The Uncompromising Imagination, 1991
- The Labyrinth of Universality, 2006
