= Scarlett Thomas =

English author

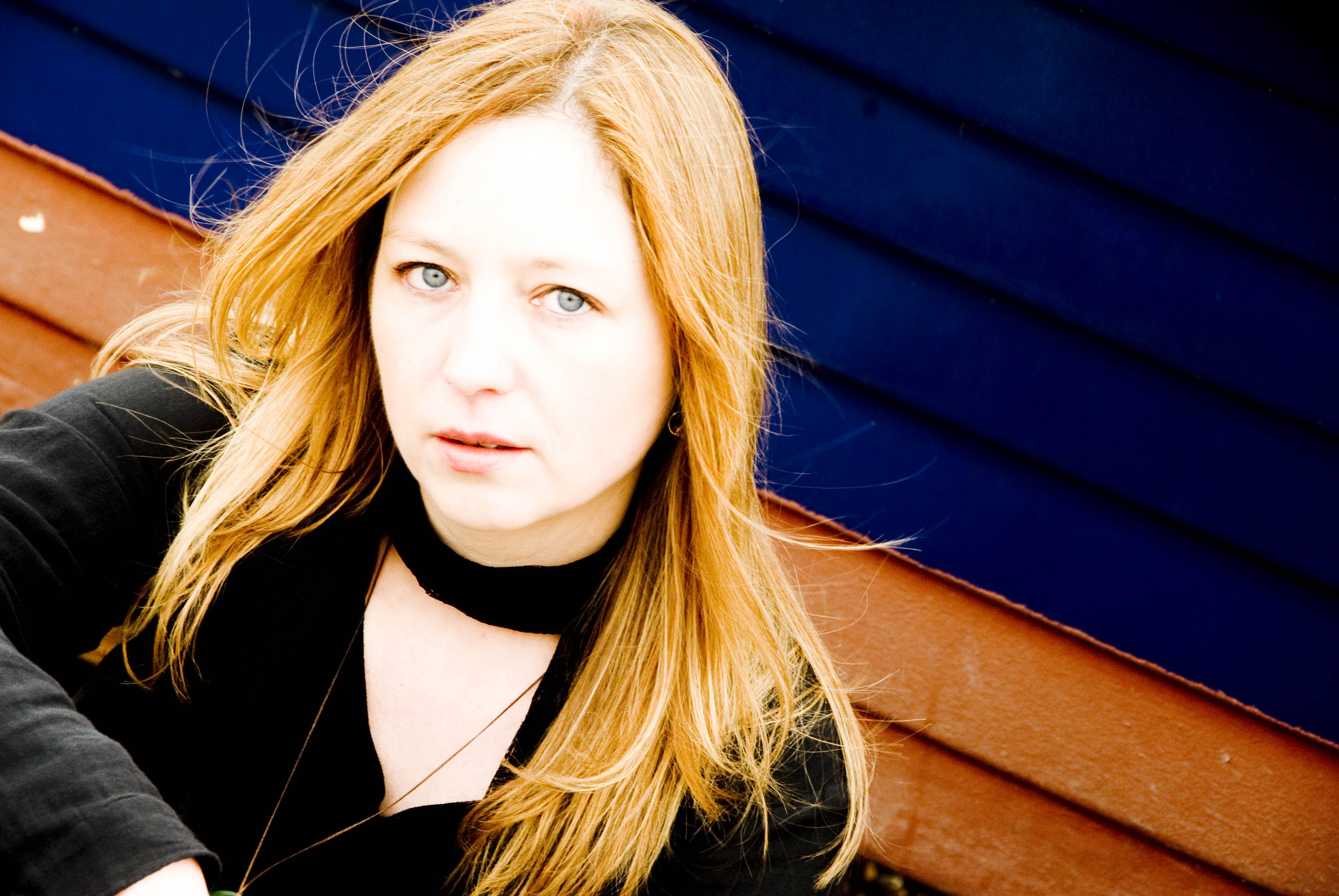
- Scarlett Thomas, in 2006
- Born: 5 July 1972 (age 54); Hammersmith, London, England
- Occupation: Novelist
- Partner: Rod Edmond
- Writing career
- Notable works: The End of Mr. Y PopCo; Our Tragic Universe
- Website: www.scarthomas.com

Scarlett Thomas (born 5 July 1972 in Hammersmith) is an English author who writes contemporary postmodern fiction. She has published ten novels, including The End of Mr. Y and PopCo, as well as the Worldquake series of children's books, and Monkeys With Typewriters, a book on how to unlock the power of storytelling. She is Professor of Creative Writing & Contemporary Fiction at the University of Kent.

== Biography ==
Thomas is the daughter of Francesca Ashurst, and attended a variety of schools, including a state junior school in Barking, Hylands School and a boarding school for eighteen months. During her teenage years she was involved in demonstrations against the Poll Tax, nuclear weapons and the first Gulf War. She studied for her A levels at Chelmsford College and achieved a First in a degree in Cultural Studies at the University of East London from 1992 to 1995.

Her first three novels feature Lily Pascale, an English literature lecturer who solves murder mysteries. Her next three novels - Bright Young Things (2001), Going Out (2002), and PopCo (2004) - took her away from genre fiction, and she used them to "explore what it means to be trapped in a culture where your identity is defined by pop culture."

Her next novel, 2006's The End of Mr. Y brought her a new level of success, and was sold in 22 countries. She followed this 4 years later with Our Tragic Universe, originally to be titled Death of the Author. In writing her ninth novel, The Seed Collectors, her research included studying towards an MSc in ethnobotany.

Recently, Thomas started writing children's fiction, publishing Dragon's Green in 2017, the first in the Worldquake series. It was followed by The Chosen Ones in 2018 and Galloglass in 2019. She wrote about her experiences of writing children's fiction, including how much she enjoyed the worldbuilding.

Away from writing fiction, she has taught Creative Writing at the University of Kent since 2004, and has previously taught at Dartmouth Community College, South East Essex College and the University of East London. She reviews books for the Literary Review, the Independent on Sunday, and Scotland on Sunday. She has also served as a member of the Edinburgh International Film Festival (2008) jury, along with Director Iain Softley and presided over by actor Danny Huston

Thomas has stated previously was working on a book called 41-0 about her year of returning to tennis - she had stopped playing when she was 14 but took it up again in 2013 to see "how high [she] could get in the rankings for [her] age." She placed in the Wimbledon Seniors in 2014. She channelled her athletic ability into running and walking, and tracked it via numerous apps, leading to a realisation she had been acting obsessively about her fitness, which she chronicled in The Guardian in 2015 and was followed by, in her words, a breakdown.

She shares with Ariel, the protagonist in The End of Mr. Y, a wish to know everything:

"I'm very much someone who wants to work out the answers. I want to know what's outside the universe, what's at the end of time, and is there a God? But I think fiction's great for that--it's very close to philosophy."

== Recognition ==
In 2001 Thomas was named by The Independent as one of 20 Best Young Writers. In 2002 she won Best New Writer in the Elle Style Awards, and also featured as an author in New Puritans, a project led by the novelists Matt Thorne and Nicholas Blincoe consisting of both a manifesto and an anthology of short stories.

== Works ==
=== Novels ===
- Dead Clever (1998)
- In Your Face (1999)
- Seaside (1999)
- Bright Young Things (2001)
- Going Out (2002)
- PopCo (2004)
- The End of Mr. Y (2006)
- Our Tragic Universe (2010)
- The Seed Collectors (2015)
- Oligarchy (2019)
- Thomas, Scarlett (9 April 2024). The Sleepwalkers. New York, NY: Simon and Schuster. ISBN 978-1-6680-3298-5. OCLC 1424633721.
- The Runner (2026)

=== Children's Fiction ===
- Dragon’s Green (2017)
- The Chosen Ones (2018)
- Galloglass (2019)
- Cosmic Dancers (2020)
- The Great Oak: The Perfect Opportunity to Bring Parents and Their Children Together Any Time of Day (2021)

=== Short stories ===
- "Brother and Sister and Foot" - Curly Tales series, on Radio 4, August 2005
- "Interlude" - Product Magazine, Winter 04–05
- "The Whole Country" - Zembla Magazine, Summer 2004
- "Why My Grandmother Learned to Play the Flute" - Curly Tales series, on Radio 4, November 2003
- "The Old School Museum" - Big Night Out, HarperCollins, 2002
- "Debbie’s Dreams" - The Stealth Corporation magazine, 2002
- "Goldfish" - Butterfly Magazine, Issue 5, 2000
- "Mind Control" - All Hail the New Puritans, 4th Estate, 2000
- "Five Easy Ways with Chilli" - 2008

=== Non-fiction ===
- Monkeys with Typewriters: How to Write Fiction and Unlock the Secret Power of Stories (2012)
- 41-Love: A Memoir (2022)
